= Prosetín =

Prosetín is name of several locations in the Czech Republic:

- Prosetín (Chrudim District) in Pardubice Region
- Prosetín (Žďár nad Sázavou) in Vysočina Region (Žďár nad Sázavou District)
