= Oslavička =

- Municipality
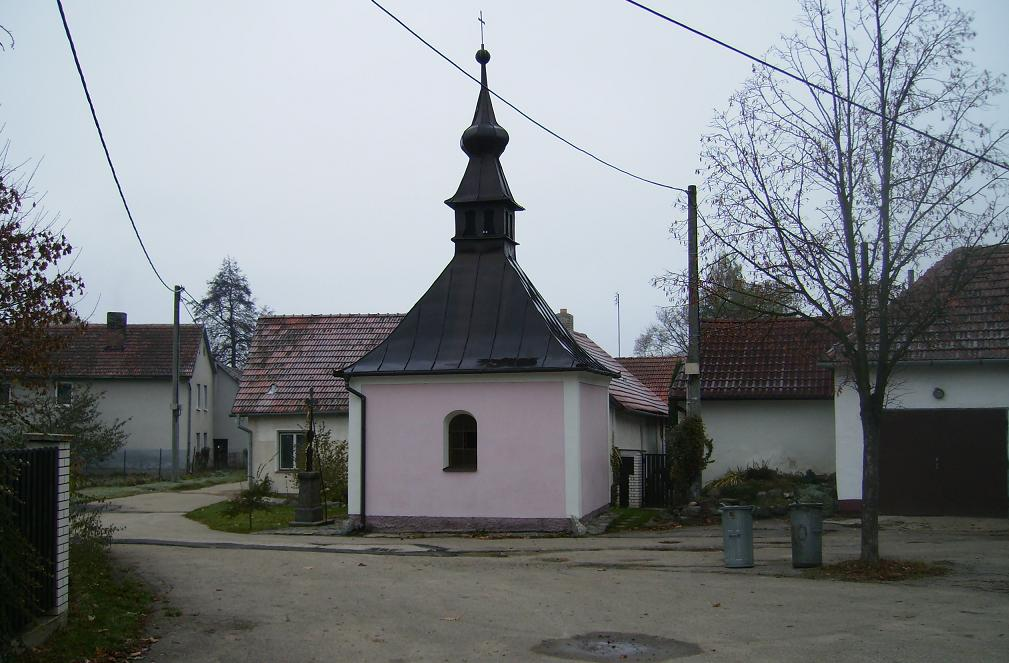
- Centre of Oslavička

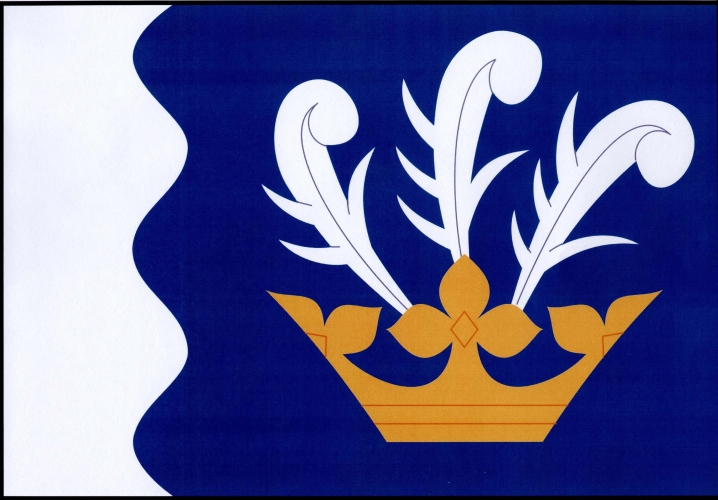
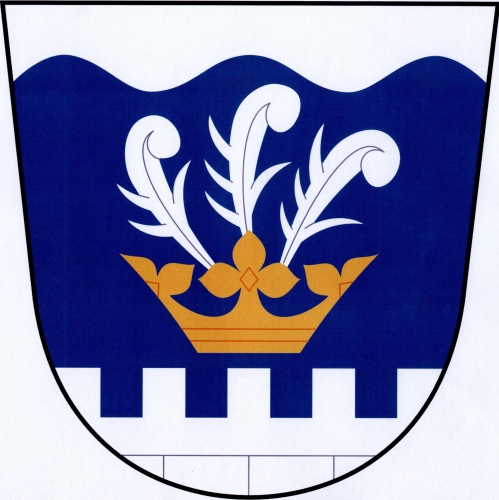
- Flag Coat of arms

- Location in the Czech Republic
- Coordinates: 49°18′56″N 15°58′0″E
- Country: Czech Republic
- Region: Vysočina
- District: Žďár nad Sázavou
- First mentioned: 1360

Area
  - Total: 4.19 km^{2} (1.62 sq mi)
- Elevation: 510 m (1,670 ft)

Population (2026-01-01)
  - Total: 131
  - Density: 31.3/km^{2} (81.0/sq mi)
- Time zone: UTC+1 (CET)
  - Summer (DST): UTC+2 (CEST)
- Postal code: 675 05
- Website: www.oslavicka.cz

Oslavička is a municipality and village in Žďár nad Sázavou District in the Vysočina Region of the Czech Republic. It has about 100 inhabitants.

Oslavička lies approximately 28 kilometres (17 mi) south of Žďár nad Sázavou, 29 km (18 mi) east of Jihlava, and 141 km (88 mi) south-east of Prague.

== Demographics ==
Historical population
Year	Pop.	±%
1869	114	—
1880	139	+21.9%
1890	150	+7.9%
1900	153	+2.0%
1910	162	+5.9%
1921	178	+9.9%
1930	171	−3.9%
1950	121	−29.2%
1961	131	+8.3%
1970	142	+8.4%
1980	120	−15.5%
1991	104	−13.3%
2001	94	−9.6%
2011	104	+10.6%
2021	137	+31.7%
Source: Censuses
