= Osové =

- Municipality
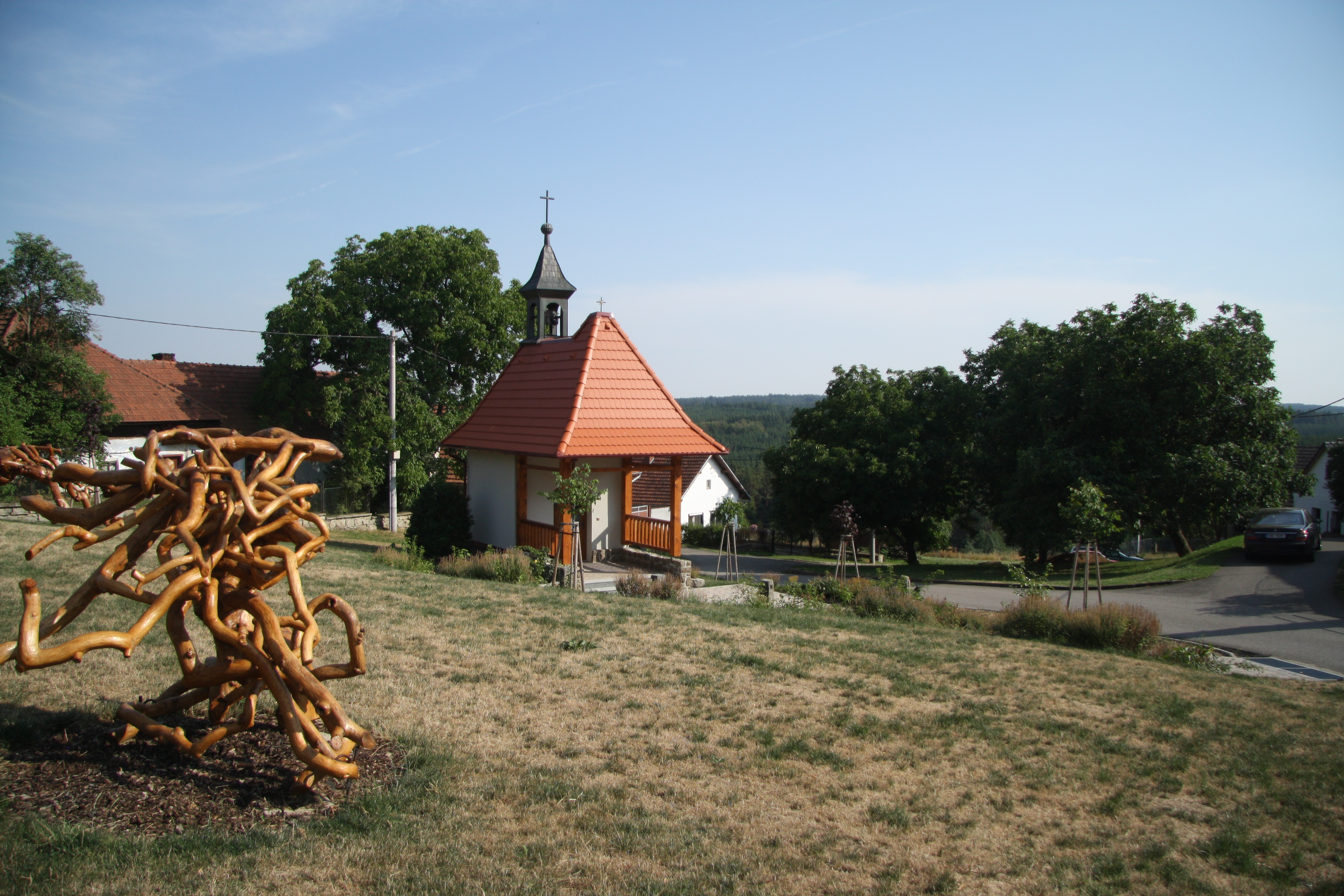
- Centre of Osové with the Chapel of Saint George

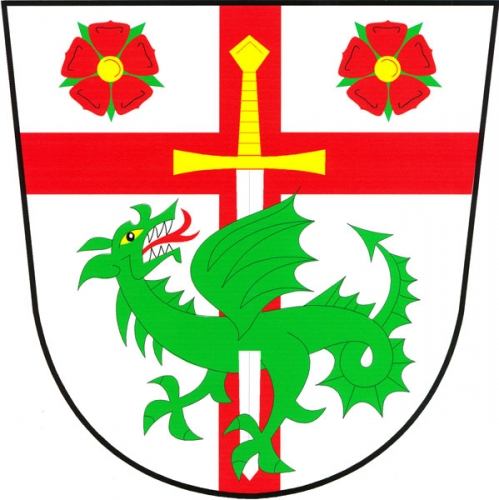
- Flag Coat of arms

- Location in the Czech Republic
- Coordinates: 49°19′31″N 16°0′56″E
- Country: Czech Republic
- Region: Vysočina
- District: Žďár nad Sázavou
- First mentioned: 1354

Area
  - Total: 3.24 km^{2} (1.25 sq mi)
- Elevation: 487 m (1,598 ft)

Population (2026-01-01)
  - Total: 103
  - Density: 31.8/km^{2} (82.3/sq mi)
- Time zone: UTC+1 (CET)
  - Summer (DST): UTC+2 (CEST)
- Postal code: 594 01

Osové is a municipality and village in Žďár nad Sázavou District in the Vysočina Region of the Czech Republic. It has about 100 inhabitants.

Osové lies approximately 28 kilometres (17 mi) south of Žďár nad Sázavou, 32 km (20 mi) east of Jihlava, and 143 km (89 mi) south-east of Prague.

== Demographics ==
Historical population
Year	Pop.	±%
1869	125	—
1880	126	+0.8%
1890	126	+0.0%
1900	107	−15.1%
1910	124	+15.9%
1921	105	−15.3%
1930	101	−3.8%
1950	92	−8.9%
1961	100	+8.7%
1970	81	−19.0%
1980	52	−35.8%
1991	45	−13.5%
2001	50	+11.1%
2011	53	+6.0%
2021	95	+79.2%
Source: Censuses
