= Počítky =

- Municipality
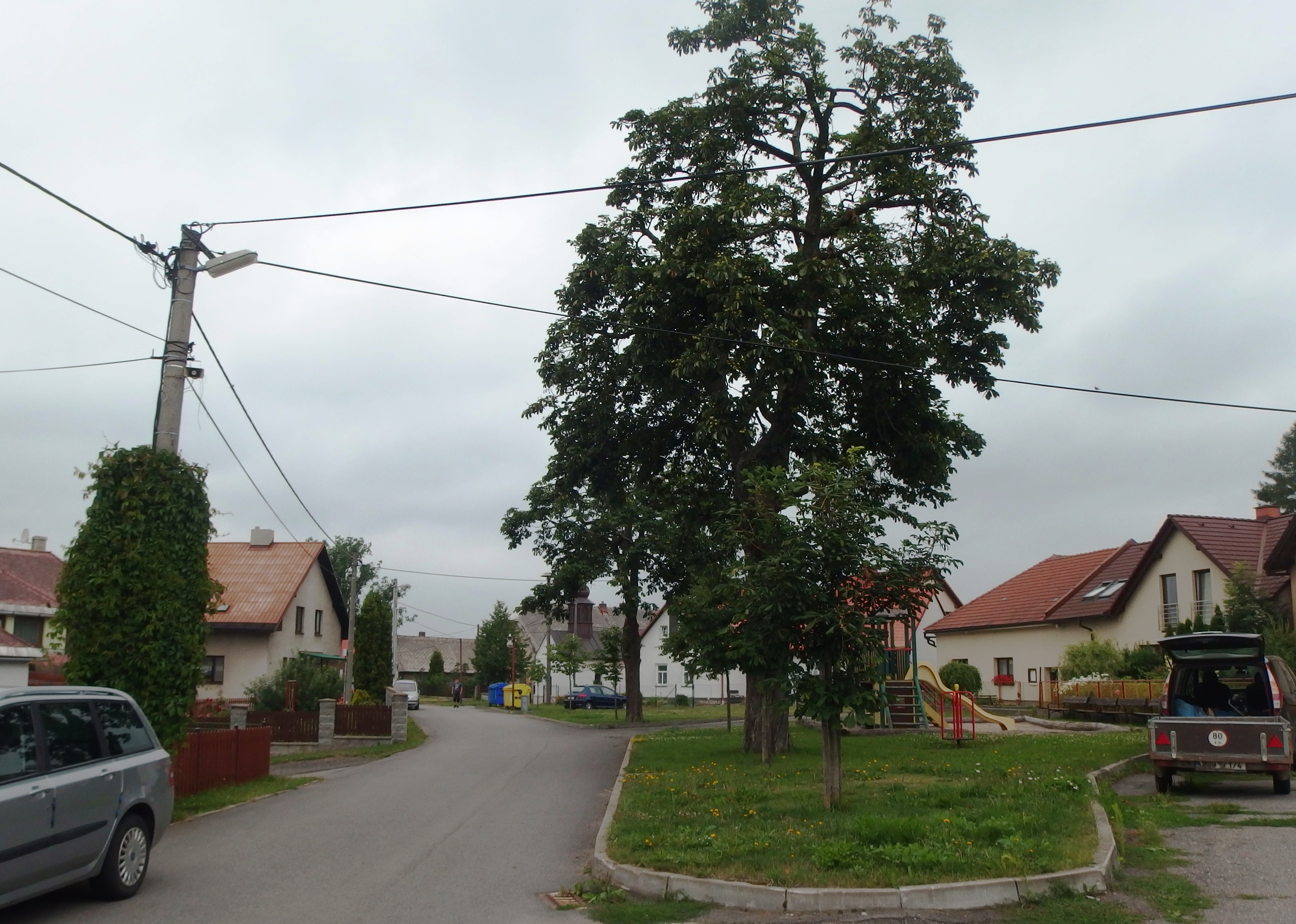
- Centre of Počítky

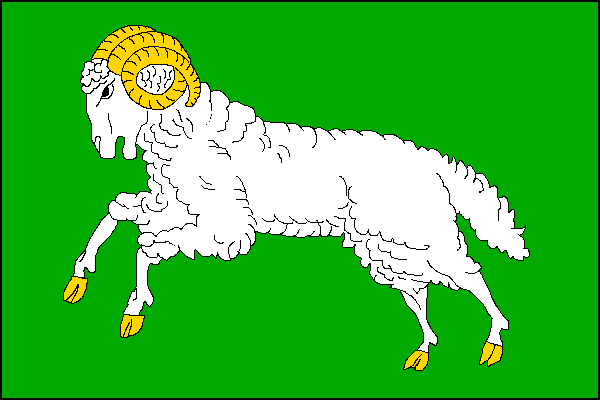
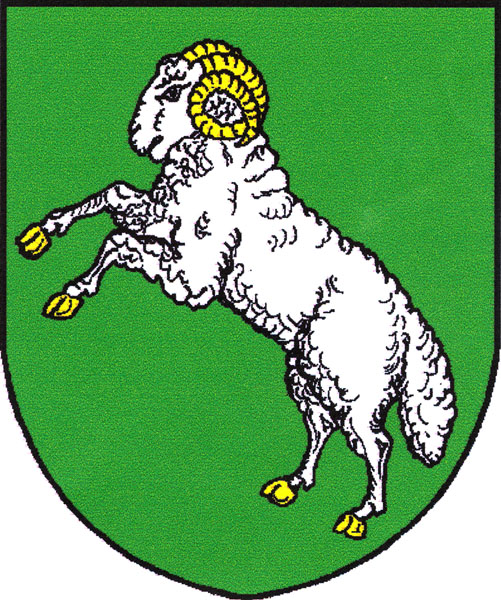
- Flag Coat of arms

- Location in the Czech Republic
- Coordinates: 49°35′19″N 15°58′19″E
- Country: Czech Republic
- Region: Vysočina
- District: Žďár nad Sázavou
- First mentioned: 1407

Area
  - Total: 6.03 km^{2} (2.33 sq mi)
- Elevation: 603 m (1,978 ft)

Population (2026-01-01)
  - Total: 240
  - Density: 40/km^{2} (100/sq mi)
- Time zone: UTC+1 (CET)
  - Summer (DST): UTC+2 (CEST)
- Postal code: 591 01
- Website: www.pocitky.cz

Počítky is a municipality and village in Žďár nad Sázavou District in the Vysočina Region of the Czech Republic. It has about 200 inhabitants.

Počítky lies approximately 4 kilometres (2 mi) north-east of Žďár nad Sázavou, 35 km (22 mi) north-east of Jihlava, and 125 km (78 mi) south-east of Prague.

== History ==
The first written mention of Počítky is from 1407.

== Demographics ==
Historical population
Year	Pop.	±%
1869	403	—
1880	430	+6.7%
1890	376	−12.6%
1900	339	−9.8%
1910	353	+4.1%
1921	350	−0.8%
1930	320	−8.6%
1950	286	−10.6%
1961	271	−5.2%
1970	222	−18.1%
1980	175	−21.2%
1991	198	+13.1%
2001	201	+1.5%
2011	202	+0.5%
2021	241	+19.3%
Source: Censuses
