= Skorotice =

- Municipality
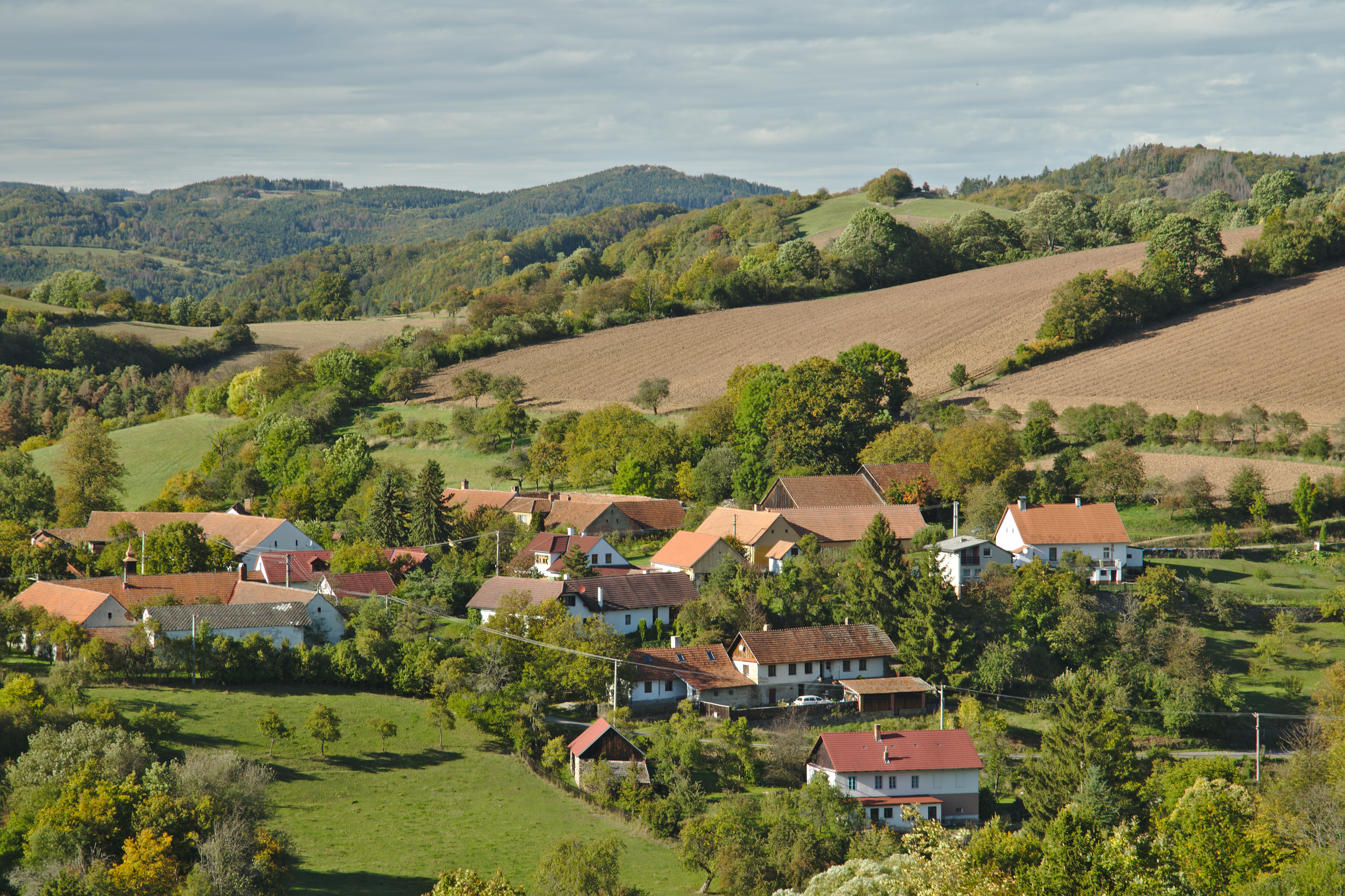
- View from the east

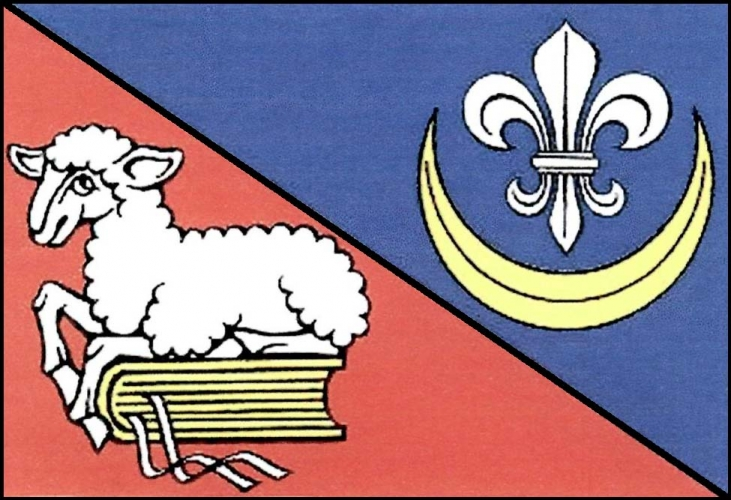
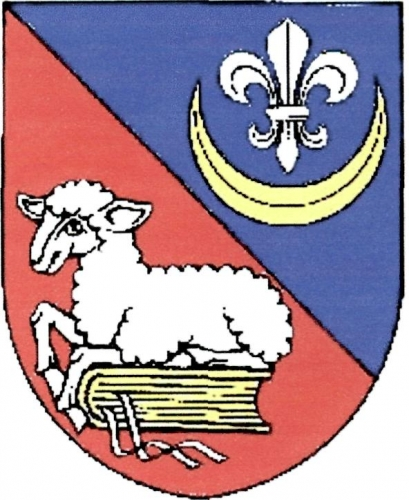
- Flag Coat of arms

- Location in the Czech Republic
- Coordinates: 49°27′26″N 16°21′33″E
- Country: Czech Republic
- Region: Vysočina
- District: Žďár nad Sázavou
- First mentioned: 1309

Area
  - Total: 7.09 km^{2} (2.74 sq mi)
- Elevation: 381 m (1,250 ft)

Population (2026-01-01)
  - Total: 138
  - Density: 19.5/km^{2} (50.4/sq mi)
- Time zone: UTC+1 (CET)
  - Summer (DST): UTC+2 (CEST)
- Postal code: 592 62
- Website: www.obecskorotice.cz

Skorotice is a municipality and village in Žďár nad Sázavou District in the Vysočina Region of the Czech Republic. It has about 100 inhabitants.

Skorotice lies approximately 34 kilometres (21 mi) east of Žďár nad Sázavou, 57 km (35 mi) east of Jihlava, and 157 km (98 mi) south-east of Prague.

== Administrative division ==
Skorotice consists of two municipal parts (in brackets population according to the 2021 census):

- Skorotice (28)
- Chlébské (104)

== Demographics ==
Historical population
Year	Pop.	±%
1869	373	—
1880	369	−1.1%
1890	423	+14.6%
1900	439	+3.8%
1910	438	−0.2%
1921	432	−1.4%
1930	428	−0.9%
1950	353	−17.5%
1961	328	−7.1%
1970	287	−12.5%
1980	205	−28.6%
1991	152	−25.9%
2001	138	−9.2%
2011	150	+8.7%
2021	132	−12.0%
Source: Censuses
