= Březejc =

- Municipality
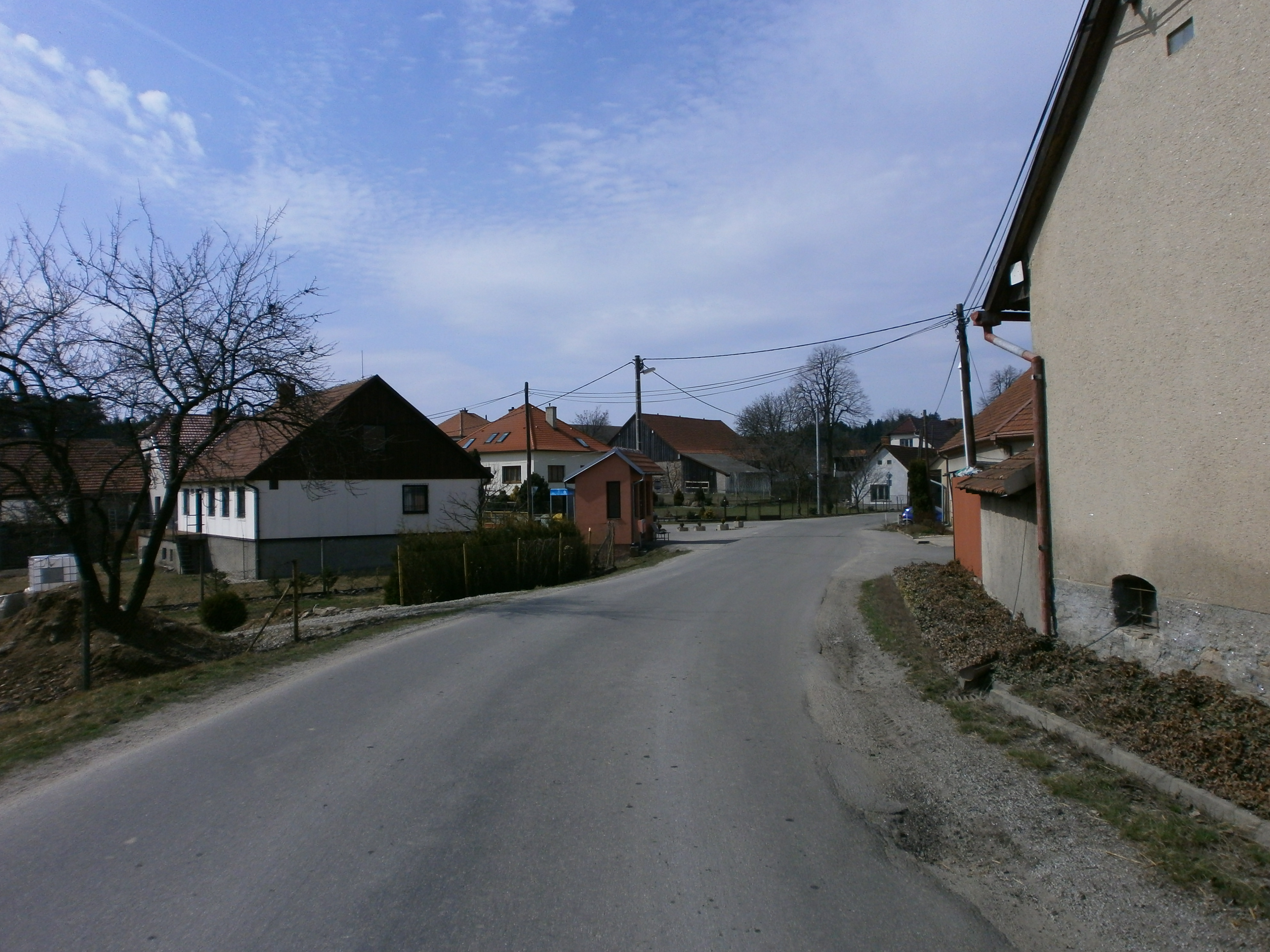
- Centre of Březejc

- Flag Coat of arms

- Location in the Czech Republic
- Coordinates: 49°20′47″N 16°5′29″E
- Country: Czech Republic
- Region: Vysočina
- District: Žďár nad Sázavou
- First mentioned: 1371

Area
  - Total: 4.51 km^{2} (1.74 sq mi)
- Elevation: 599 m (1,965 ft)

Population (2026-01-01)
  - Total: 161
  - Density: 35.7/km^{2} (92.5/sq mi)
- Time zone: UTC+1 (CET)
  - Summer (DST): UTC+2 (CEST)
- Postal code: 594 01
- Website: www.brezejc.cz

Březejc is a municipality and village in Žďár nad Sázavou District in the Vysočina Region of the Czech Republic. It has about 200 inhabitants.

Březejc lies approximately 27 kilometres (17 mi) south-east of Žďár nad Sázavou, 38 km (24 mi) east of Jihlava, and 147 km (91 mi) south-east of Prague.

== Demographics ==
Historical population
Year	Pop.	±%
1869	186	—
1880	171	−8.1%
1890	185	+8.2%
1900	181	−2.2%
1910	199	+9.9%
1921	194	−2.5%
1930	176	−9.3%
1950	139	−21.0%
1961	153	+10.1%
1970	144	−5.9%
1980	142	−1.4%
1991	142	+0.0%
2001	137	−3.5%
2011	142	+3.6%
2021	150	+5.6%
Source: Censuses
