= Vepřová =

- Municipality
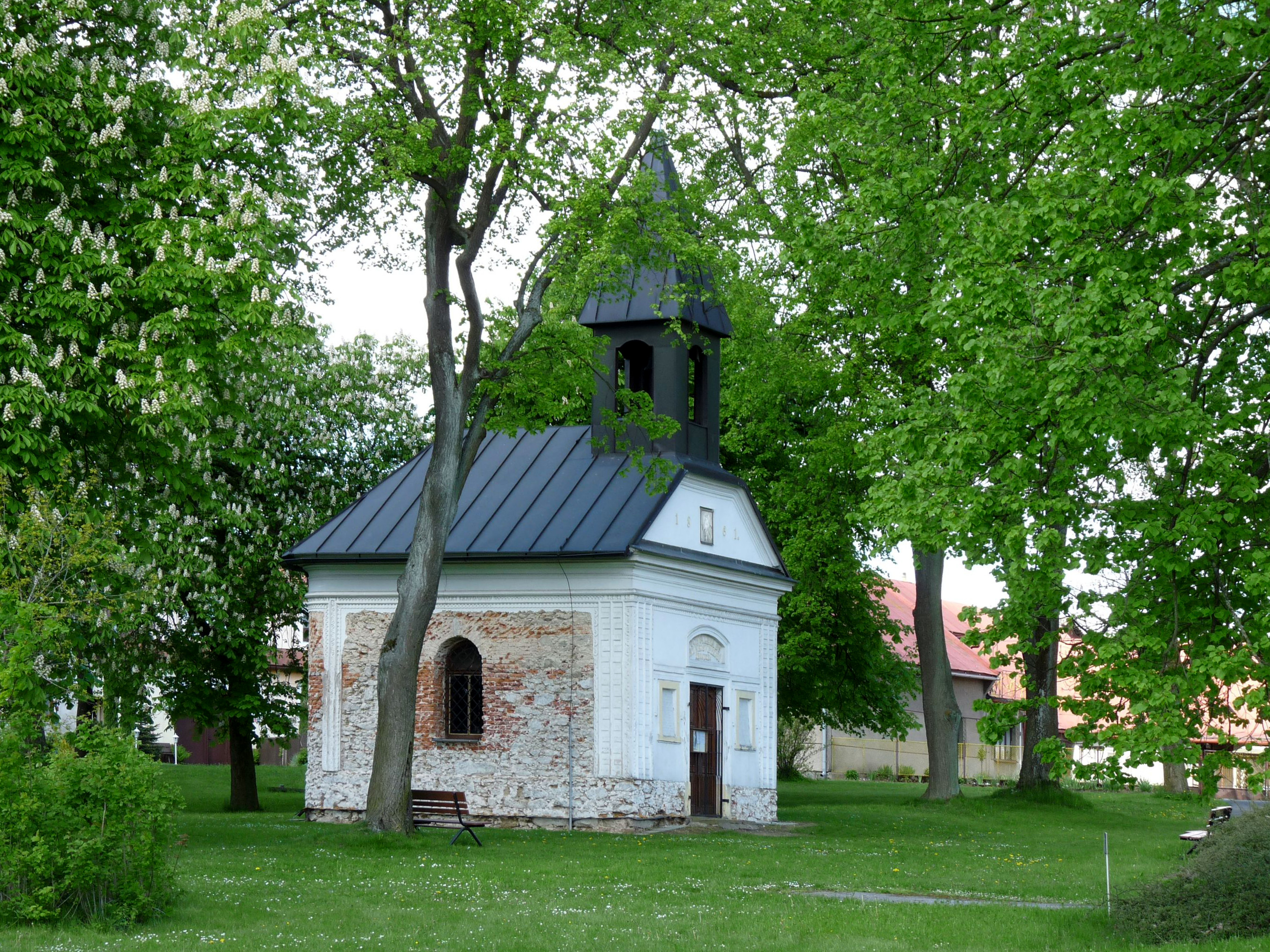
- Chapel of the Holy Trinity

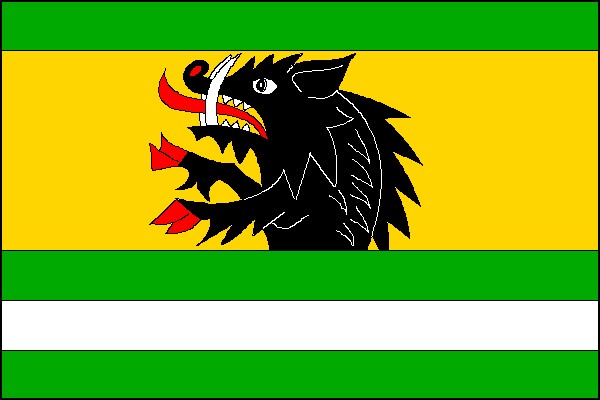
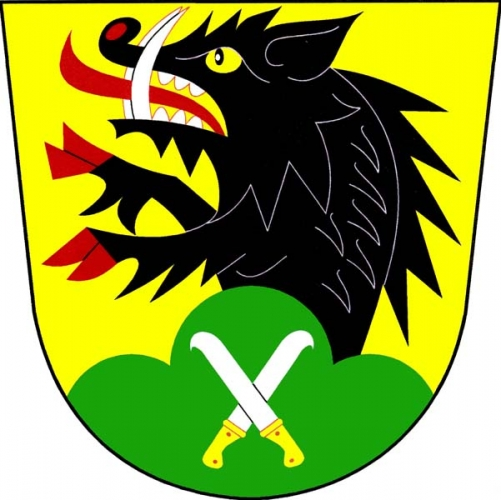
- Flag Coat of arms

- Location in the Czech Republic
- Coordinates: 49°36′45″N 15°49′39″E
- Country: Czech Republic
- Region: Vysočina
- District: Žďár nad Sázavou
- First mentioned: 1502

Area
  - Total: 10.44 km^{2} (4.03 sq mi)
- Elevation: 630 m (2,070 ft)

Population (2026-01-01)
  - Total: 449
  - Density: 43.0/km^{2} (111/sq mi)
- Time zone: UTC+1 (CET)
  - Summer (DST): UTC+2 (CEST)
- Postal code: 592 11
- Website: www.veprova.cz

Vepřová is a municipality and village in Žďár nad Sázavou District in the Vysočina Region of the Czech Republic. It has about 400 inhabitants.

Vepřová lies approximately 10 kilometres (6 mi) north-west of Žďár nad Sázavou, 30 km (19 mi) north-east of Jihlava, and 114 km (71 mi) south-east of Prague.

== Demographics ==
Historical population
| Year | Pop. | ±% |
|---|---|---|
| 1869 | 460 | — |
| 1880 | 474 | +3.0% |
| 1890 | 492 | +3.8% |
| 1900 | 494 | +0.4% |
| 1910 | 510 | +3.2% |
| 1921 | 498 | −2.4% |
| 1930 | 414 | −16.9% |
| 1950 | 347 | −16.2% |
| 1961 | 360 | +3.7% |
| 1970 | 366 | +1.7% |
| 1980 | 390 | +6.6% |
| 1991 | 367 | −5.9% |
| 2001 | 387 | +5.4% |
| 2011 | 406 | +4.9% |
| 2021 | 420 | +3.4% |
Source: Censuses
