= Horní Rožínka =

- Municipality
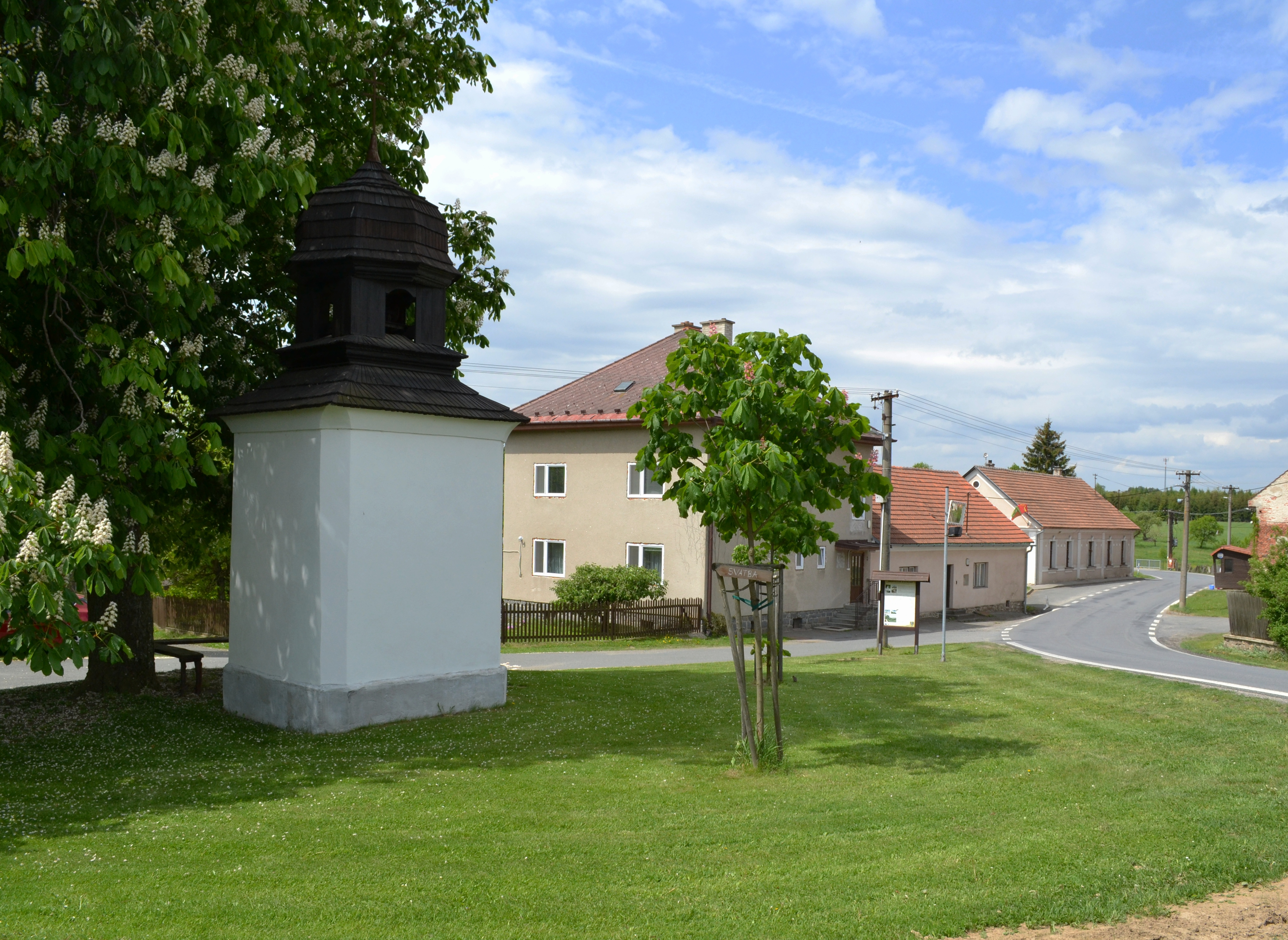
- Belfry in the centre of Horní Rožínka

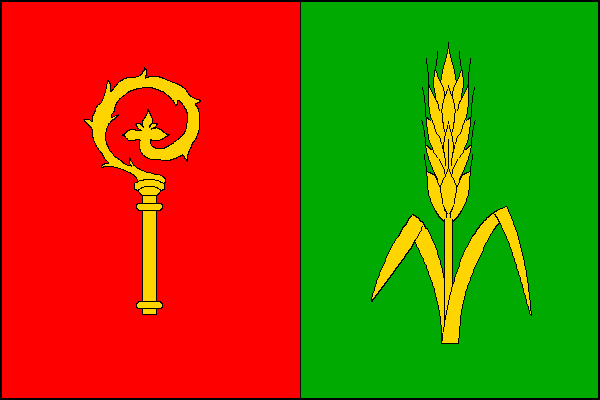
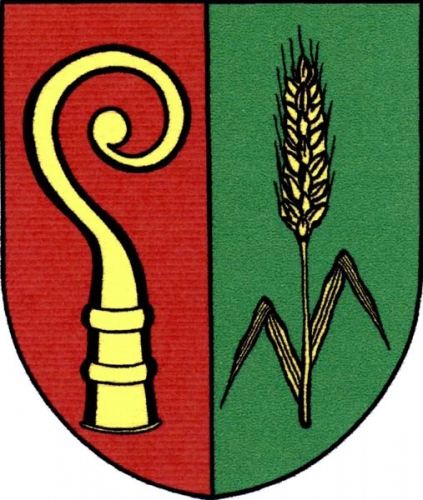
- Flag Coat of arms

- Location in the Czech Republic
- Coordinates: 49°30′0″N 16°11′35″E
- Country: Czech Republic
- Region: Vysočina
- District: Žďár nad Sázavou
- First mentioned: 1366

Area
  - Total: 2.03 km^{2} (0.78 sq mi)
- Elevation: 528 m (1,732 ft)

Population (2026-01-01)
  - Total: 85
  - Density: 42/km^{2} (110/sq mi)
- Time zone: UTC+1 (CET)
  - Summer (DST): UTC+2 (CEST)
- Postal code: 592 51
- Website: www.hornirozinka.cz

Horní Rožínka is a municipality and village in Žďár nad Sázavou District in the Vysočina Region of the Czech Republic. It has about 90 inhabitants.

Horní Rožínka lies approximately 20 kilometres (12 mi) east of Žďár nad Sázavou, 46 km (29 mi) east of Jihlava, and 144 km (89 mi) south-east of Prague.

== Demographics ==
Historical population
Year	Pop.	±%
1869	213	—
1880	199	−6.6%
1890	194	−2.5%
1900	173	−10.8%
1910	175	+1.2%
1921	151	−13.7%
1930	141	−6.6%
1950	116	−17.7%
1961	156	+34.5%
1970	143	−8.3%
1980	124	−13.3%
1991	95	−23.4%
2001	100	+5.3%
2011	84	−16.0%
2021	67	−20.2%
Source: Censuses
