= Ubušínek =

- Municipality
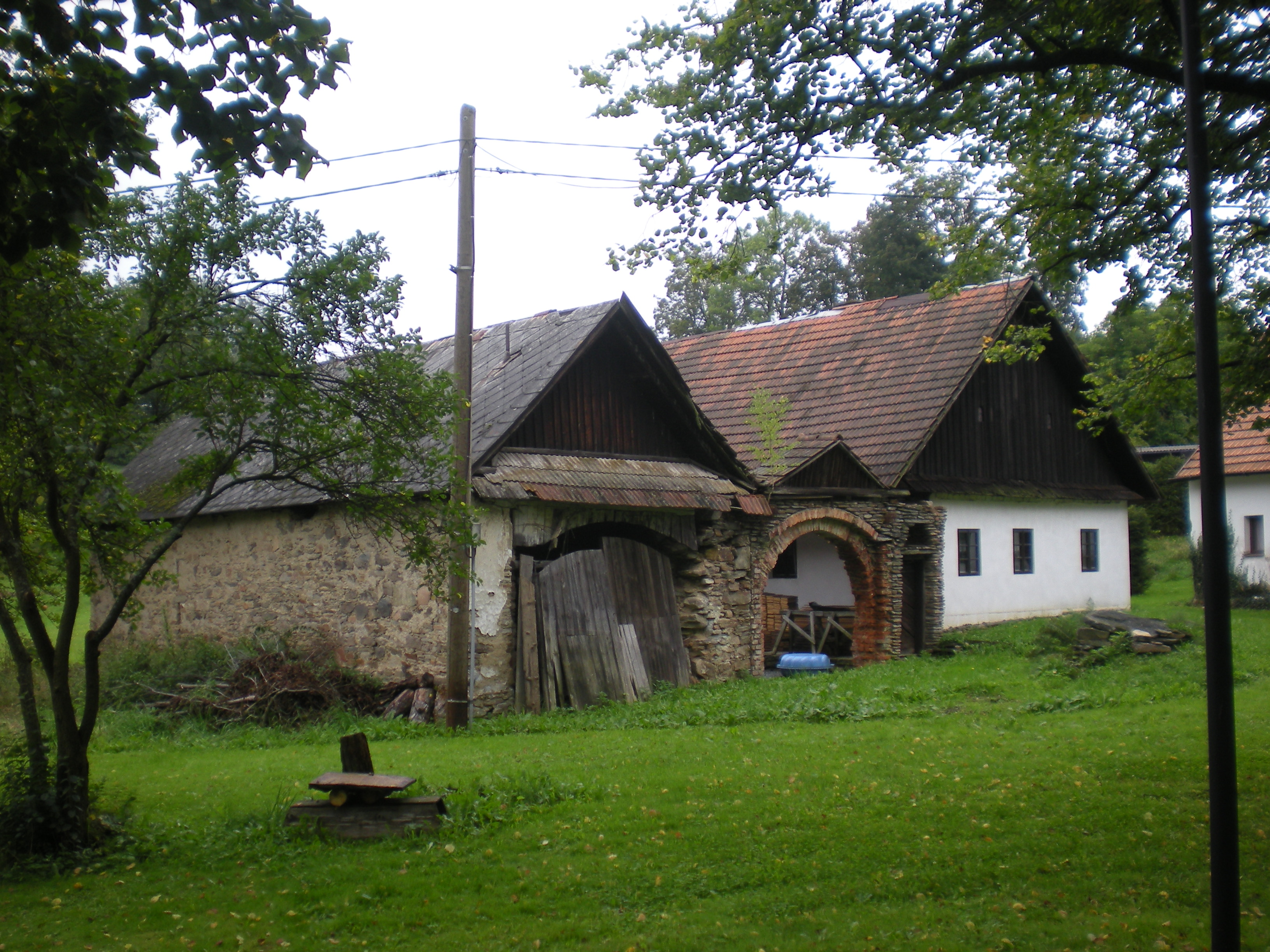
- Homestead No. 26

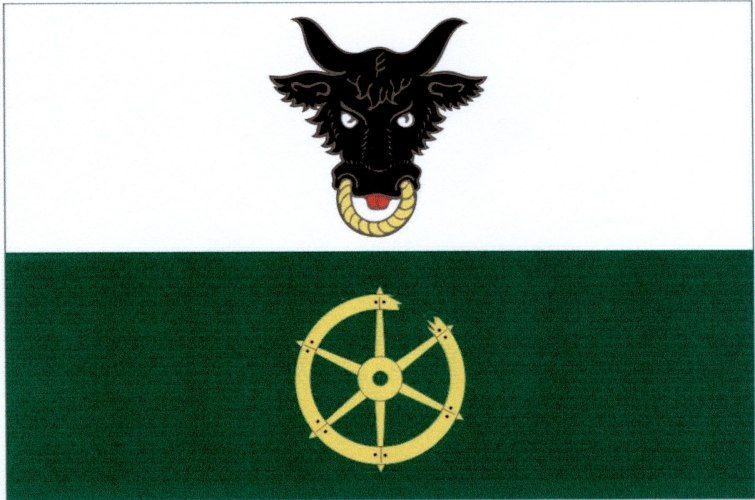
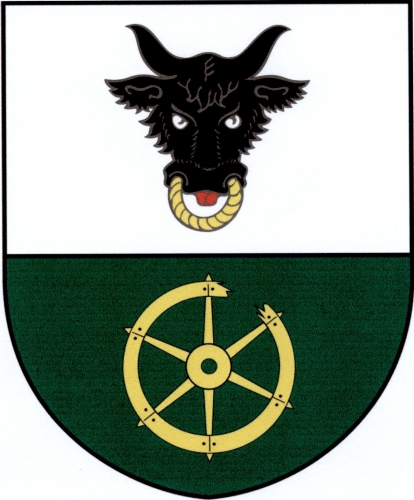
- Flag Coat of arms

- Location in the Czech Republic
- Coordinates: 49°36′38″N 16°16′54″E
- Country: Czech Republic
- Region: Vysočina
- District: Žďár nad Sázavou
- First mentioned: 1390

Area
  - Total: 2.78 km^{2} (1.07 sq mi)
- Elevation: 600 m (2,000 ft)

Population (2026-01-01)
  - Total: 85
  - Density: 31/km^{2} (79/sq mi)
- Time zone: UTC+1 (CET)
  - Summer (DST): UTC+2 (CEST)
- Postal code: 592 65
- Website: www.ubusinek.cz

Ubušínek (German: Klein Ubuschin) is a municipality and village in Žďár nad Sázavou District in the Vysočina Region of the Czech Republic. It has about 90 inhabitants.

Ubušínek lies approximately 26 kilometres (16 mi) east of Žďár nad Sázavou, 56 km (35 mi) north-east of Jihlava, and 144 km (89 mi) east of Prague.

== Demographics ==
Historical population
Year	Pop.	±%
1869	186	—
1880	198	+6.5%
1890	163	−17.7%
1900	156	−4.3%
1910	170	+9.0%
1921	166	−2.4%
1930	161	−3.0%
1950	129	−19.9%
1961	134	+3.9%
1970	132	−1.5%
1980	122	−7.6%
1991	116	−4.9%
2001	100	−13.8%
2011	92	−8.0%
2021	80	−13.0%
Source: Censuses
