= Radňoves =

- Municipality
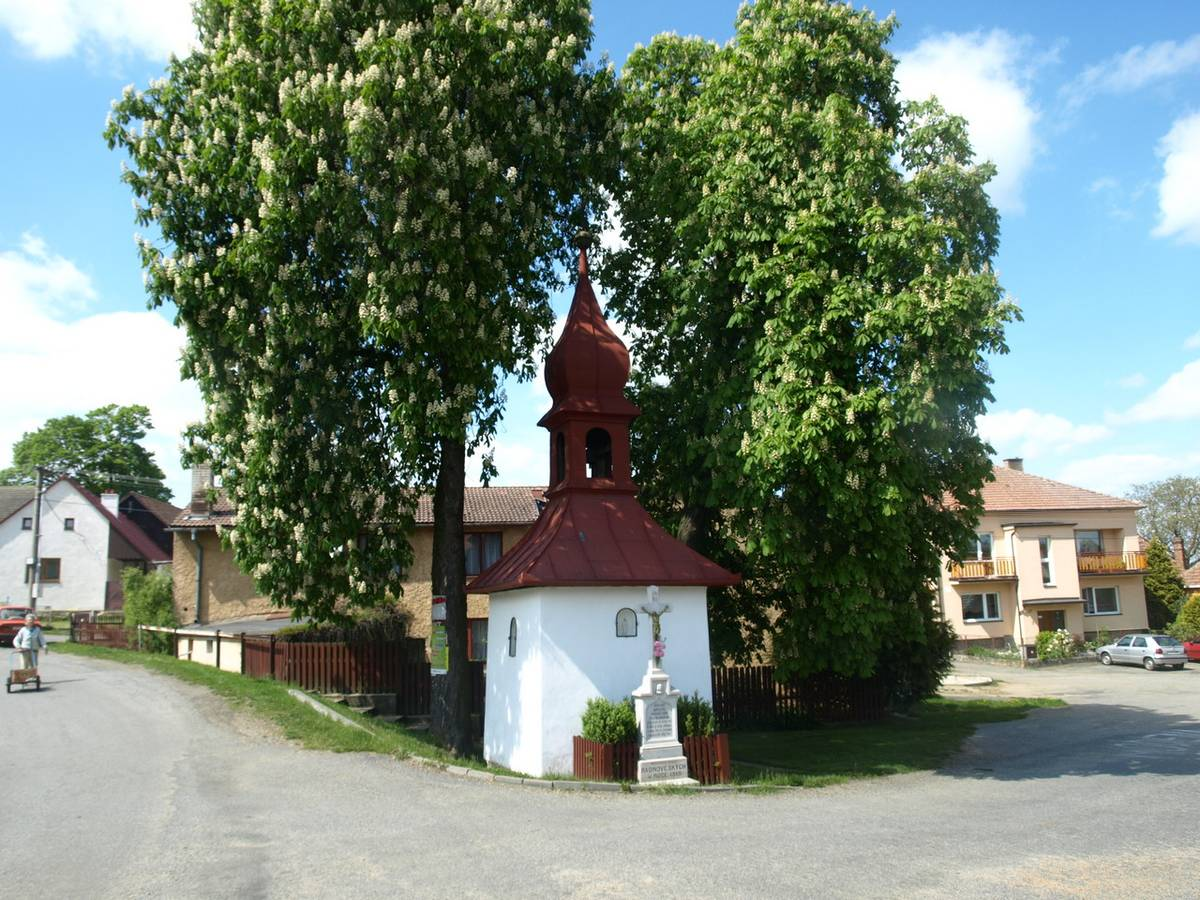
- Chapel in the centre of Radňoves

- Flag Coat of arms

- Location in the Czech Republic
- Coordinates: 49°23′19″N 16°12′50″E
- Country: Czech Republic
- Region: Vysočina
- District: Žďár nad Sázavou
- First mentioned: 1364

Area
  - Total: 2.73 km^{2} (1.05 sq mi)
- Elevation: 532 m (1,745 ft)

Population (2026-01-01)
  - Total: 99
  - Density: 36/km^{2} (94/sq mi)
- Time zone: UTC+1 (CET)
  - Summer (DST): UTC+2 (CEST)
- Postal code: 594 51
- Website: radnoves.cz

Radňoves is a municipality and village in Žďár nad Sázavou District in the Vysočina Region of the Czech Republic. It has about 100 inhabitants.

Radňoves lies approximately 28 kilometres (17 mi) south-east of Žďár nad Sázavou, 46 km (29 mi) east of Jihlava, and 151 km (94 mi) south-east of Prague.

== Demographics ==
Historical population
Year	Pop.	±%
1869	231	—
1880	217	−6.1%
1890	216	−0.5%
1900	196	−9.3%
1910	187	−4.6%
1921	167	−10.7%
1930	149	−10.8%
1950	130	−12.8%
1961	124	−4.6%
1970	125	+0.8%
1980	122	−2.4%
1991	113	−7.4%
2001	108	−4.4%
2011	107	−0.9%
2021	95	−11.2%
Source: Censuses
