= Blízkov =

- Municipality
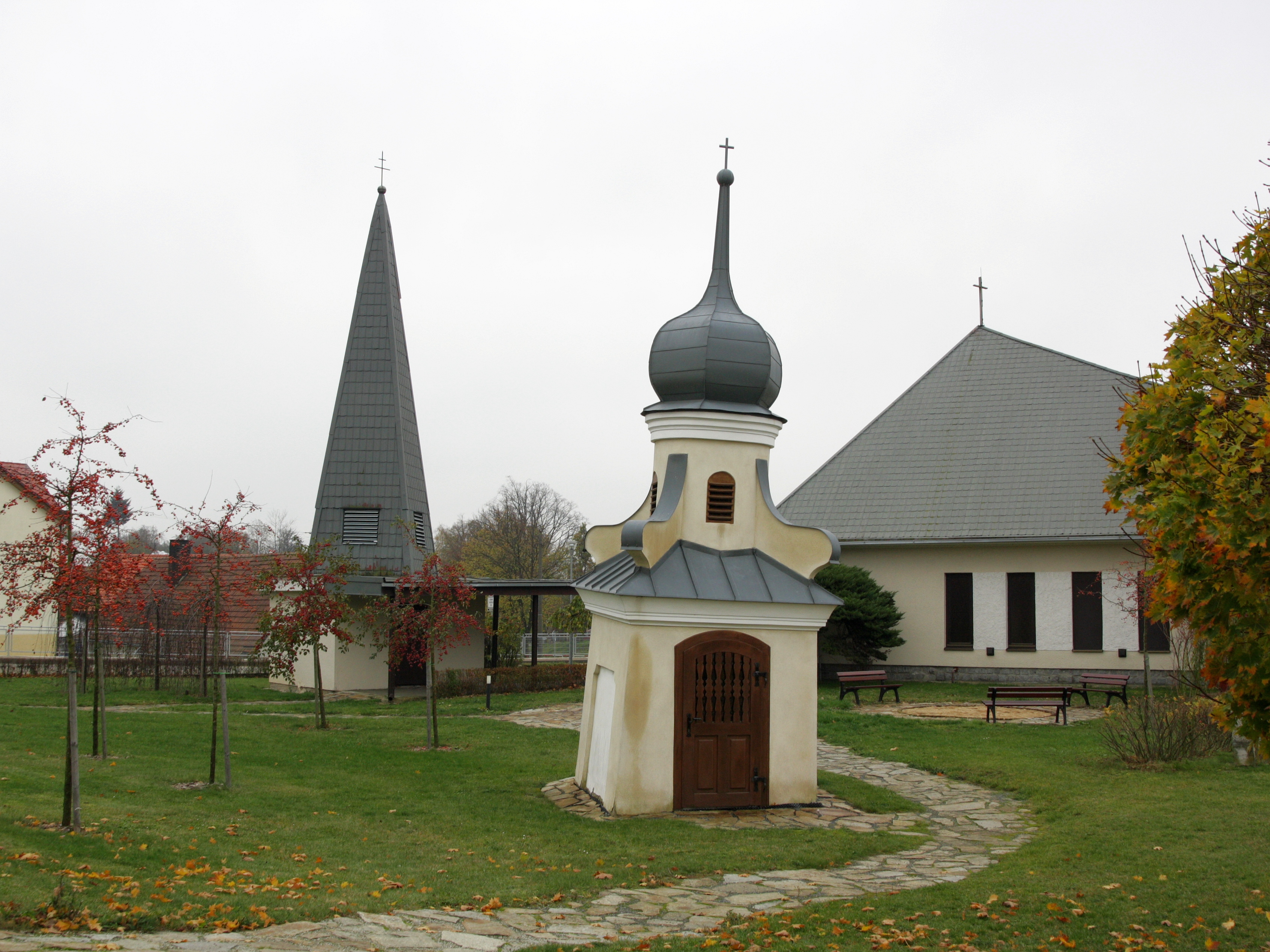
- Chapel of Saint John of Nepomuk

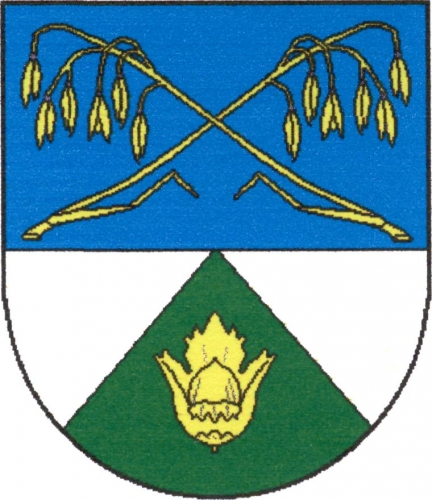
- Flag Coat of arms

- Location in the Czech Republic
- Coordinates: 49°24′2″N 15°54′31″E
- Country: Czech Republic
- Region: Vysočina
- District: Žďár nad Sázavou
- First mentioned: 1298

Area
  - Total: 13.44 km^{2} (5.19 sq mi)
- Elevation: 494 m (1,621 ft)

Population (2026-01-01)
  - Total: 342
  - Density: 25.4/km^{2} (65.9/sq mi)
- Time zone: UTC+1 (CET)
  - Summer (DST): UTC+2 (CEST)
- Postal code: 594 42
- Website: www.blizkov.cz

Blízkov is a municipality and village in Žďár nad Sázavou District in the Vysočina Region of the Czech Republic. It has about 300 inhabitants.

Blízkov lies approximately 19 kilometres (12 mi) south of Žďár nad Sázavou, 24 km (15 mi) east of Jihlava, and 132 km (82 mi) south-east of Prague.

== Administrative division ==
Blízkov consists of two municipal parts (in brackets population according to the 2021 census):

- Blízkov (248)
- Dědkov (78)

== Demographics ==
Historical population
Year	Pop.	±%
1869	568	—
1880	571	+0.5%
1890	607	+6.3%
1900	525	−13.5%
1910	579	+10.3%
1921	577	−0.3%
1930	536	−7.1%
1950	444	−17.2%
1961	435	−2.0%
1970	421	−3.2%
1980	399	−5.2%
1991	353	−11.5%
2001	340	−3.7%
2011	304	−10.6%
2021	326	+7.2%
Source: Censuses
