= Bobrůvka =

- Municipality
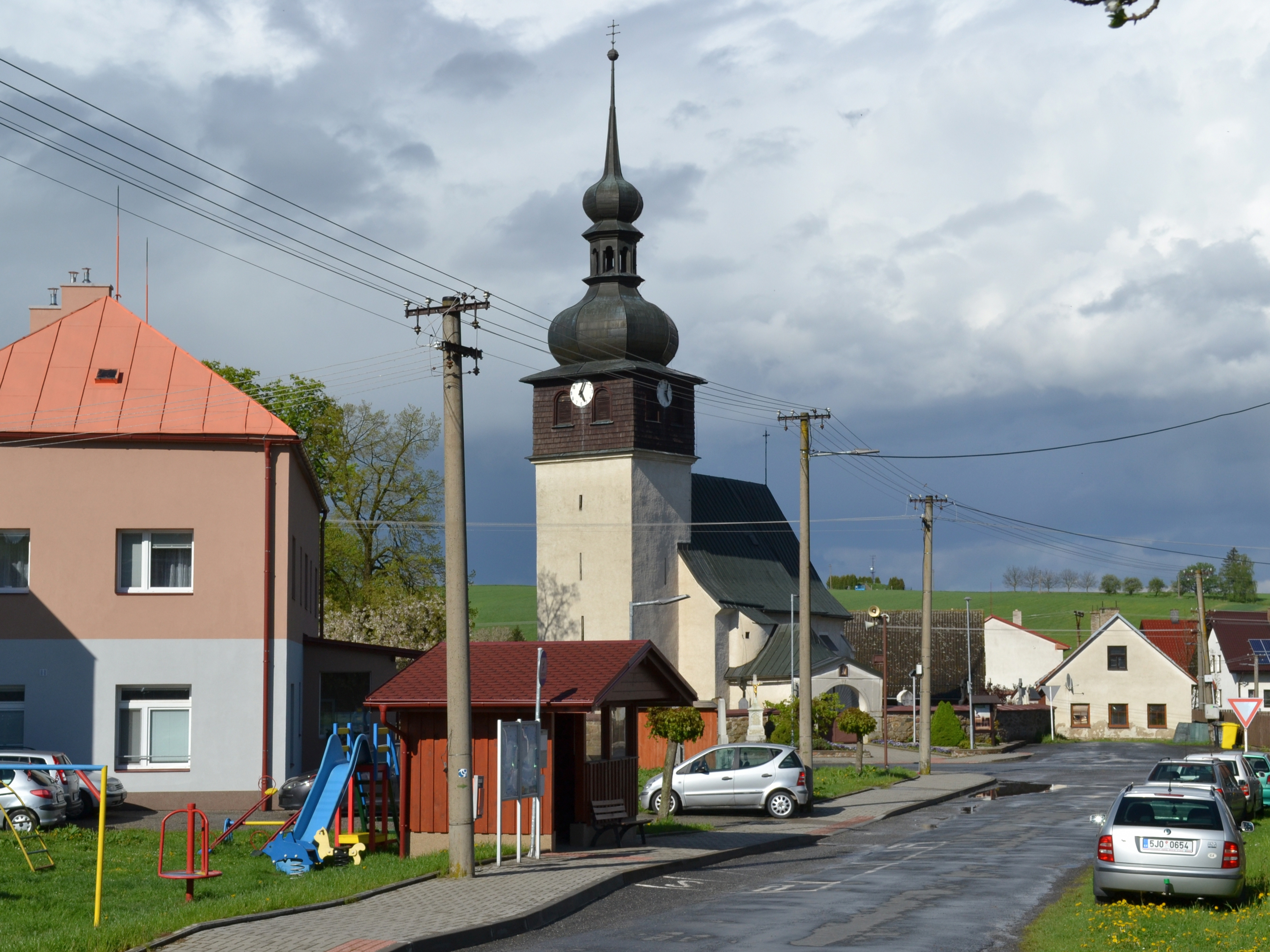
- Centre of Bobrůvka with the Church of Saint Bartholomew

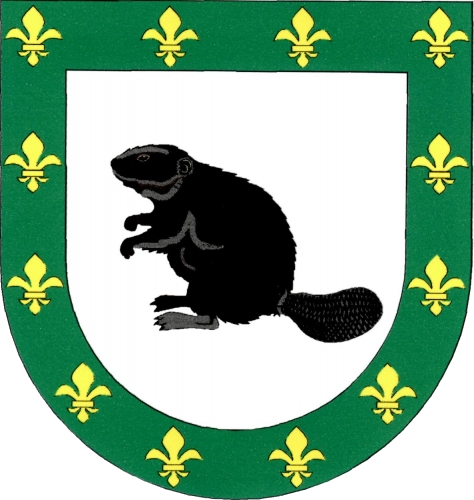
- Flag Coat of arms

- Location in the Czech Republic
- Coordinates: 49°26′55″N 16°5′38″E
- Country: Czech Republic
- Region: Vysočina
- District: Žďár nad Sázavou
- First mentioned: 1262

Area
  - Total: 7.80 km^{2} (3.01 sq mi)
- Elevation: 530 m (1,740 ft)

Population (2026-01-01)
  - Total: 237
  - Density: 30.4/km^{2} (78.7/sq mi)
- Time zone: UTC+1 (CET)
  - Summer (DST): UTC+2 (CEST)
- Postal code: 592 55
- Website: bobruvka.cz

Bobrůvka is a municipality and village in Žďár nad Sázavou District in the Vysočina Region of the Czech Republic. It has about 200 inhabitants.

Bobrůvka lies approximately 17 kilometres (11 mi) south-east of Žďár nad Sázavou, 37 km (23 mi) east of Jihlava, and 140 km (87 mi) south-east of Prague.

== Demographics ==
Historical population
Year	Pop.	±%
1869	412	—
1880	455	+10.4%
1890	408	−10.3%
1900	394	−3.4%
1910	368	−6.6%
1921	347	−5.7%
1930	340	−2.0%
1950	304	−10.6%
1961	328	+7.9%
1970	319	−2.7%
1980	282	−11.6%
1991	253	−10.3%
2001	245	−3.2%
2011	240	−2.0%
2021	238	−0.8%
Source: Censuses
