= Březské =

- Municipality
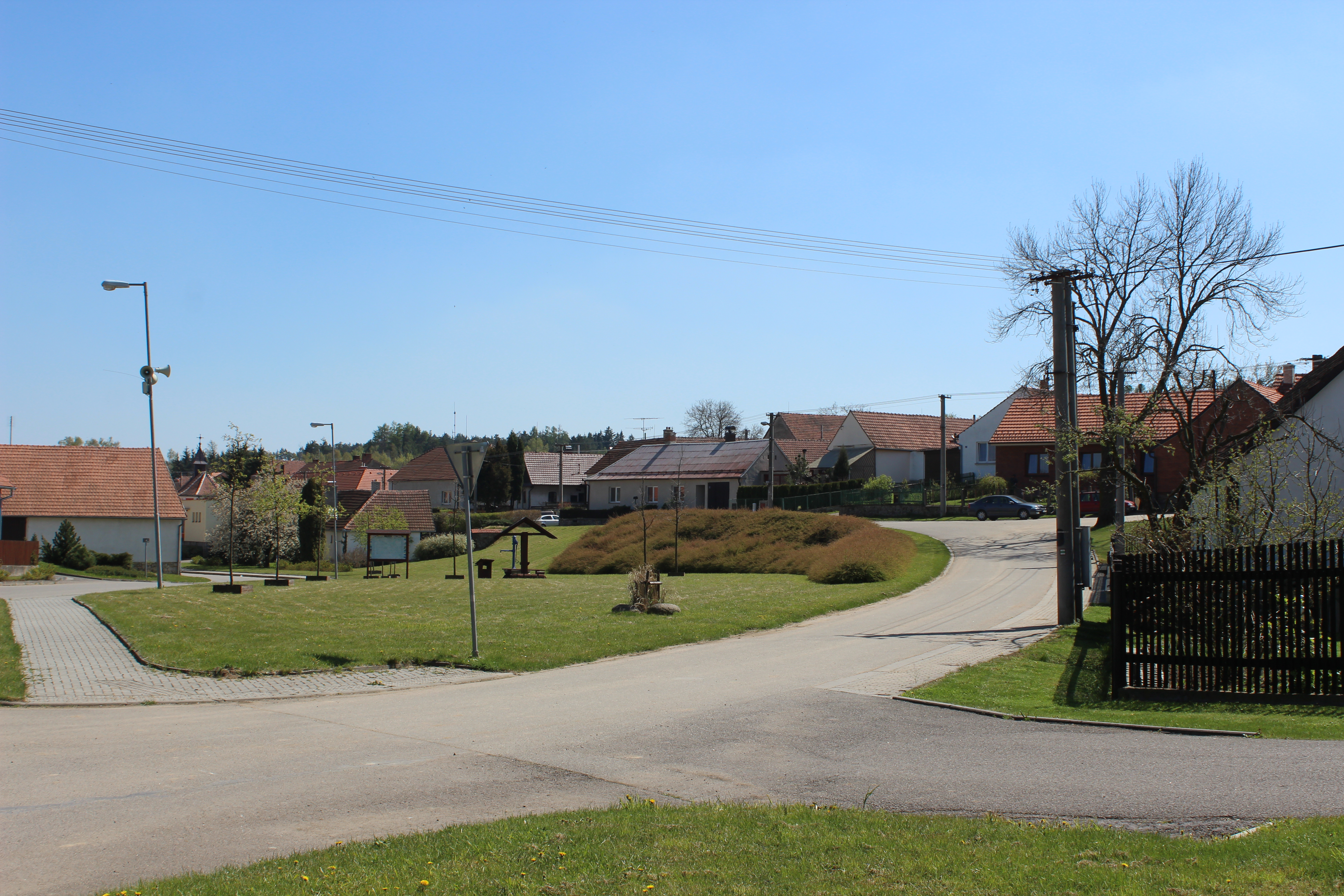
- Centre of Březské

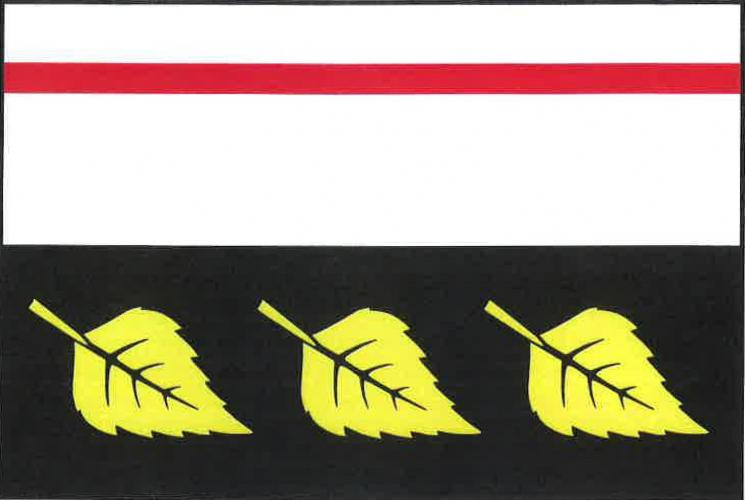
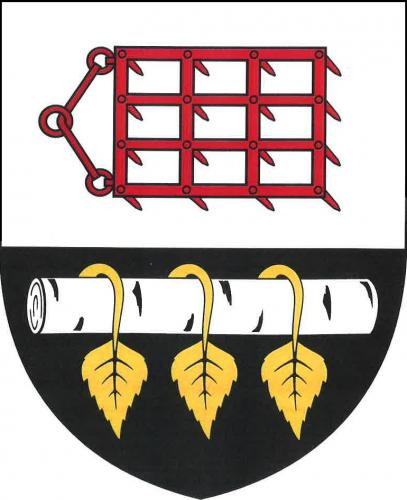
- Flag Coat of arms

- Location in the Czech Republic
- Coordinates: 49°19′48″N 16°14′17″E
- Country: Czech Republic
- Region: Vysočina
- District: Žďár nad Sázavou
- First mentioned: 1349

Area
  - Total: 6.80 km^{2} (2.63 sq mi)
- Elevation: 469 m (1,539 ft)

Population (2026-01-01)
  - Total: 186
  - Density: 27.4/km^{2} (70.8/sq mi)
- Time zone: UTC+1 (CET)
  - Summer (DST): UTC+2 (CEST)
- Postal code: 594 53
- Website: www.brezske.cz

Březské is a municipality and village in Žďár nad Sázavou District in the Vysočina Region of the Czech Republic. It has about 200 inhabitants.

Březské lies approximately 35 kilometres (22 mi) south-east of Žďár nad Sázavou, 47 km (29 mi) east of Jihlava, and 156 km (97 mi) south-east of Prague.

== Demographics ==
Historical population
Year	Pop.	±%
1869	295	—
1880	305	+3.4%
1890	286	−6.2%
1900	317	+10.8%
1910	305	−3.8%
1921	321	+5.2%
1930	292	−9.0%
1950	219	−25.0%
1961	200	−8.7%
1970	193	−3.5%
1980	176	−8.8%
1991	242	+37.5%
2001	239	−1.2%
2011	197	−17.6%
2021	175	−11.2%
Source: Censuses
