= Jabloňov =

- Municipality
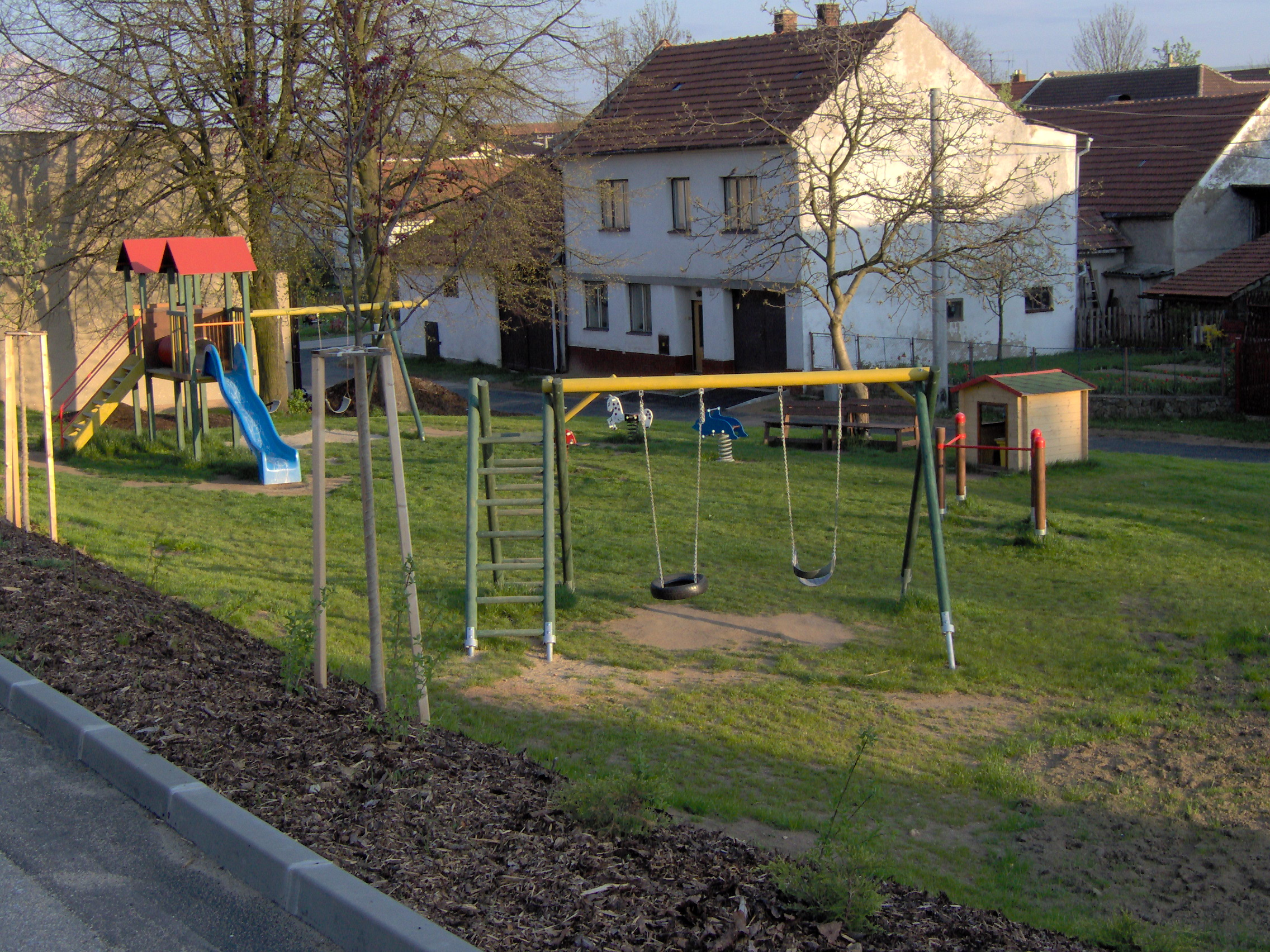
- Playground in the centre of Jabloňov

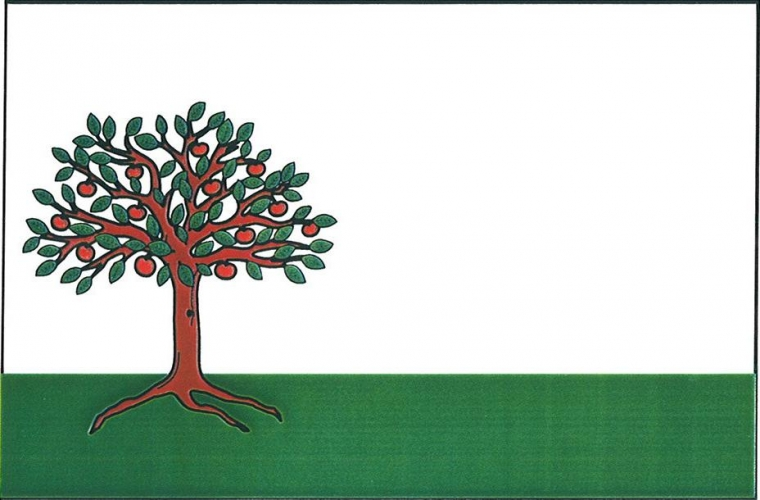
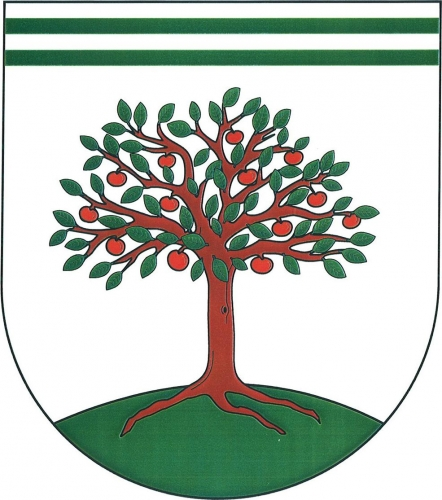
- Flag Coat of arms

- Location in the Czech Republic
- Coordinates: 49°19′27″N 16°5′23″E
- Country: Czech Republic
- Region: Vysočina
- District: Žďár nad Sázavou
- First mentioned: 1361

Area
  - Total: 8.84 km^{2} (3.41 sq mi)
- Elevation: 496 m (1,627 ft)

Population (2026-01-01)
  - Total: 352
  - Density: 39.8/km^{2} (103/sq mi)
- Time zone: UTC+1 (CET)
  - Summer (DST): UTC+2 (CEST)
- Postal code: 594 01
- Website: www.jablonov.cz

Jabloňov is a municipality and village in Žďár nad Sázavou District in the Vysočina Region of the Czech Republic. It has about 400 inhabitants.

Jabloňov lies approximately 29 kilometres (18 mi) south of Žďár nad Sázavou, 38 km (24 mi) east of Jihlava, and 147 km (91 mi) south-east of Prague.

== Demographics ==
Historical population
Year	Pop.	±%
1869	400	—
1880	461	+15.3%
1890	413	−10.4%
1900	447	+8.2%
1910	415	−7.2%
1921	406	−2.2%
1930	416	+2.5%
1950	320	−23.1%
1961	341	+6.6%
1970	322	−5.6%
1980	302	−6.2%
1991	299	−1.0%
2001	321	+7.4%
2011	341	+6.2%
2021	329	−3.5%
Source: Censuses
