= Věstín =

- Municipality
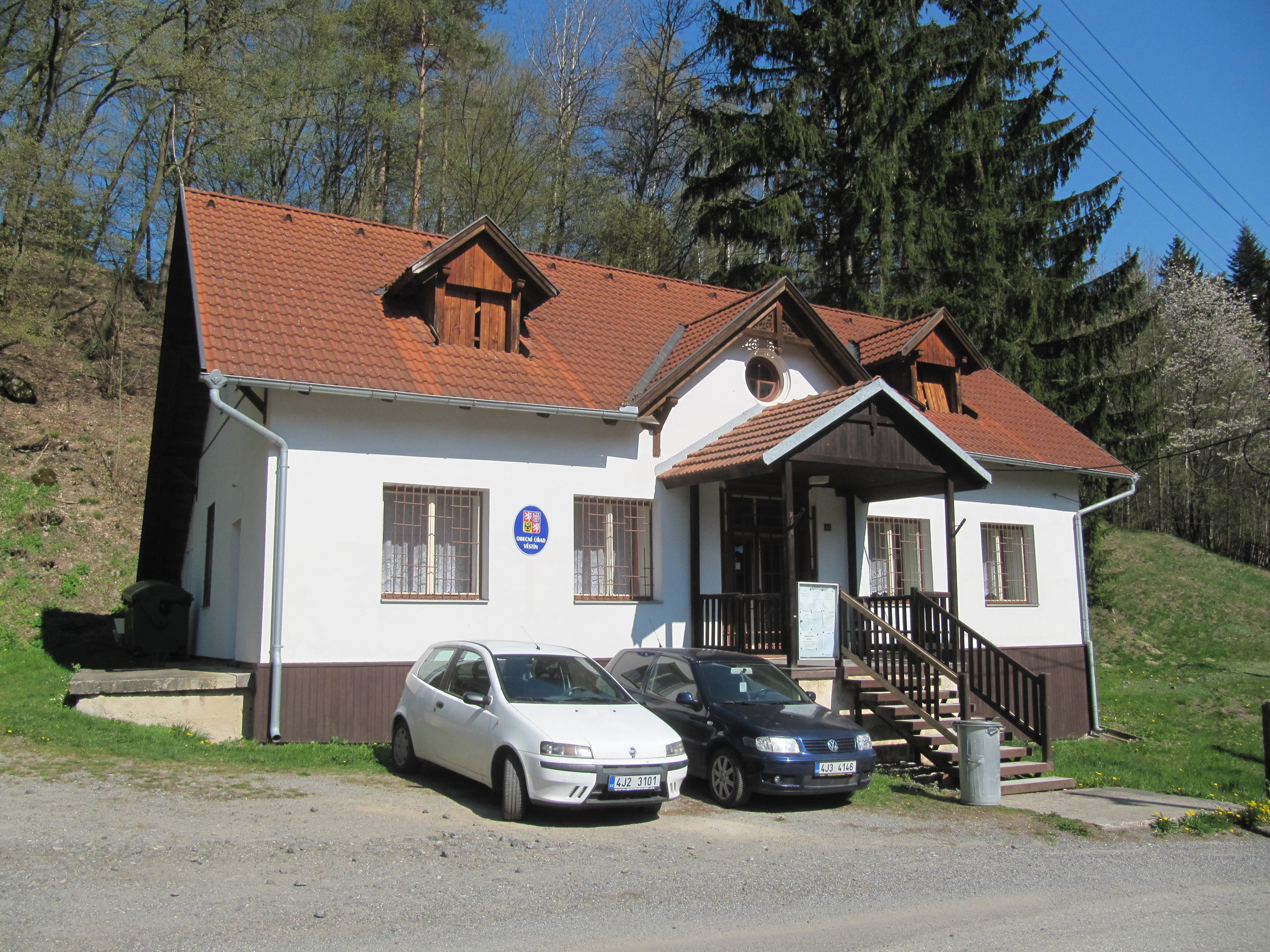
- Municipal office

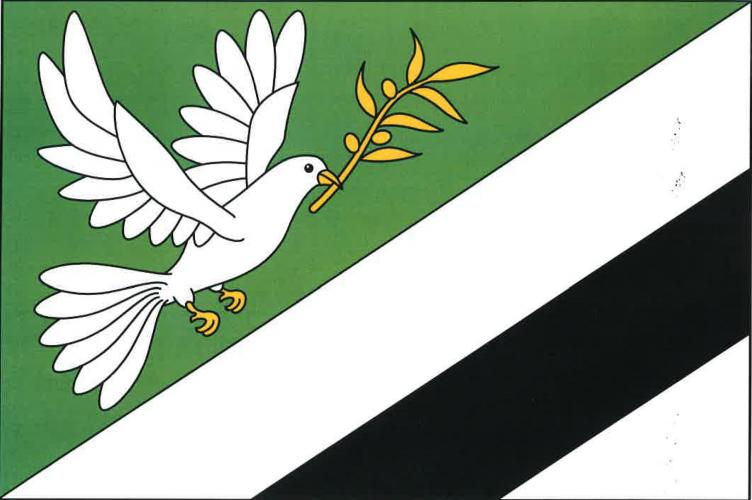
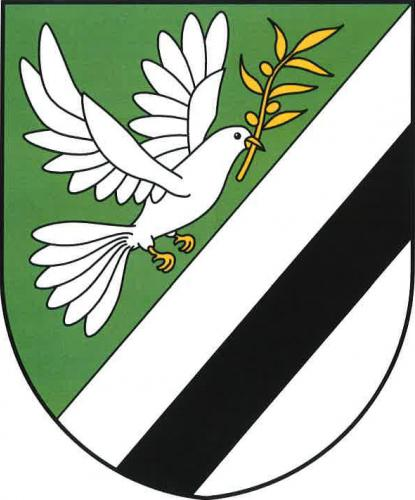
- Flag Coat of arms

- Location in the Czech Republic
- Coordinates: 49°34′0″N 16°20′24″E
- Country: Czech Republic
- Region: Vysočina
- District: Žďár nad Sázavou
- First mentioned: 1349

Area
  - Total: 9.14 km^{2} (3.53 sq mi)
- Elevation: 540 m (1,770 ft)

Population (2026-01-01)
  - Total: 166
  - Density: 18.2/km^{2} (47.0/sq mi)
- Time zone: UTC+1 (CET)
  - Summer (DST): UTC+2 (CEST)
- Postal code: 592 65, 593 01
- Website: www.obecvestin.cz

Věstín is a municipality and village in Žďár nad Sázavou District in the Vysočina Region of the Czech Republic. It has about 200 inhabitants.

Věstín lies approximately 29 kilometres (18 mi) east of Žďár nad Sázavou, 58 km (36 mi) east of Jihlava, and 150 km (93 mi) south-east of Prague.

== Administrative division ==
Věstín consists of three municipal parts (in brackets population according to the 2021 census):

- Věstín (35)
- Bolešín (81)
- Věstínek (43)

== Demographics ==
Historical population
Year	Pop.	±%
1869	571	—
1880	561	−1.8%
1890	568	+1.2%
1900	570	+0.4%
1910	545	−4.4%
1921	564	+3.5%
1930	518	−8.2%
1950	395	−23.7%
1961	387	−2.0%
1970	344	−11.1%
1980	279	−18.9%
1991	223	−20.1%
2001	188	−15.7%
2011	165	−12.2%
2021	159	−3.6%
Source: Censuses
