= Pokojov =

- Municipality
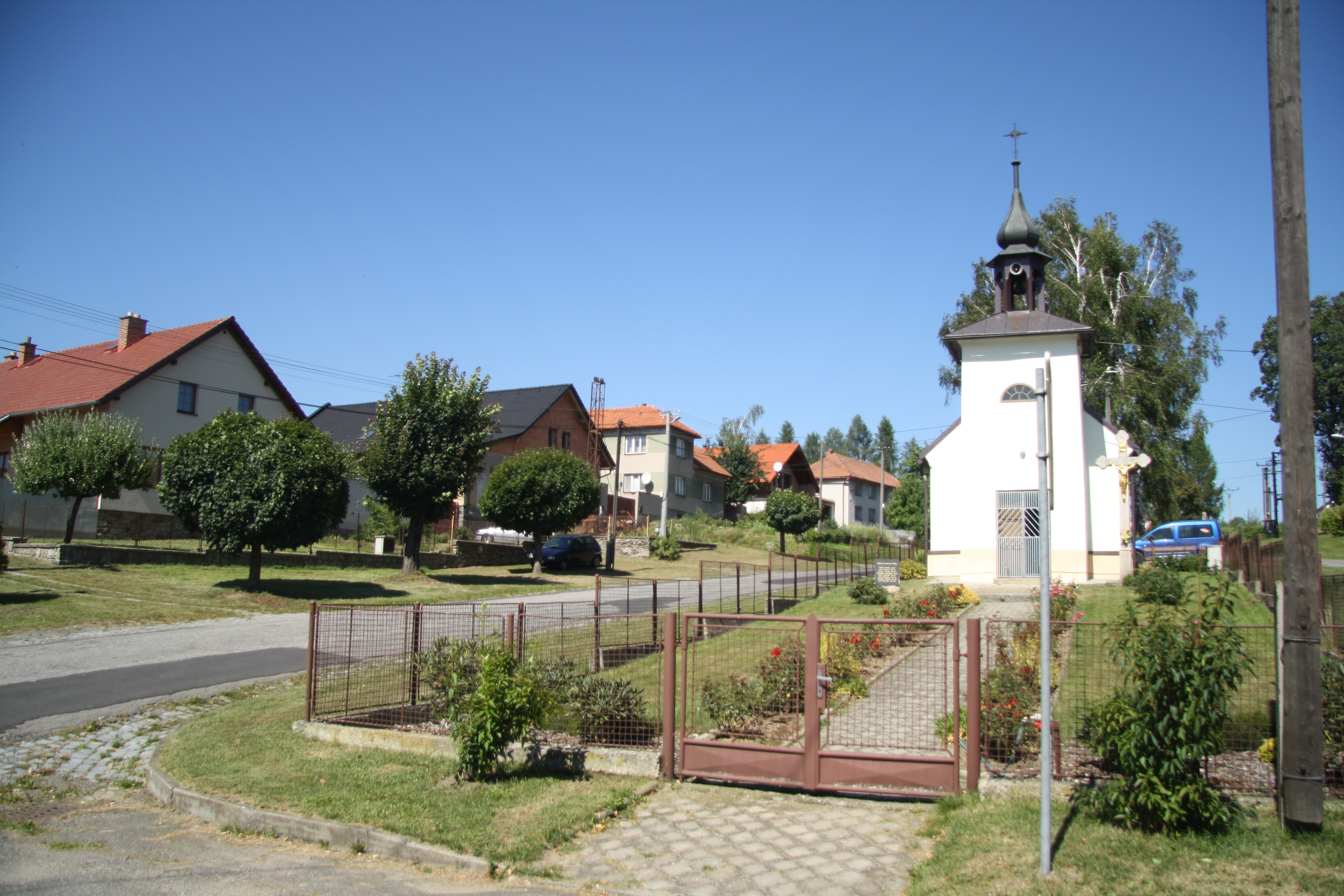
- Centre of Pokojov

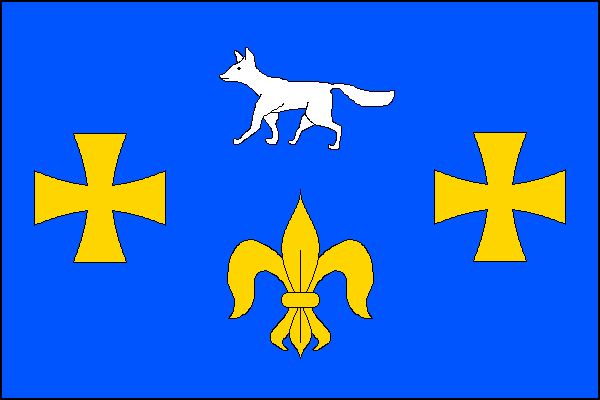
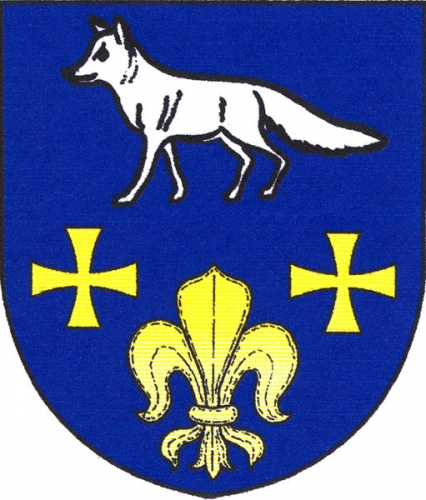
- Flag Coat of arms

- Location in the Czech Republic
- Coordinates: 49°28′54″N 15°54′24″E
- Country: Czech Republic
- Region: Vysočina
- District: Žďár nad Sázavou
- First mentioned: 1483

Area
  - Total: 3.29 km^{2} (1.27 sq mi)
- Elevation: 565 m (1,854 ft)

Population (2026-01-01)
  - Total: 134
  - Density: 40.7/km^{2} (105/sq mi)
- Time zone: UTC+1 (CET)
  - Summer (DST): UTC+2 (CEST)
- Postal code: 592 14
- Website: www.obecpokojov.cz

Pokojov is a municipality and village in Žďár nad Sázavou District in the Vysočina Region of the Czech Republic. It has about 100 inhabitants.

Pokojov lies approximately 10 kilometres (6 mi) south of Žďár nad Sázavou, 25 km (16 mi) north-east of Jihlava, and 126 km (78 mi) south-east of Prague.

== Demographics ==
Historical population
Year	Pop.	±%
1869	193	—
1880	191	−1.0%
1890	188	−1.6%
1900	206	+9.6%
1910	220	+6.8%
1921	180	−18.2%
1930	148	−17.8%
1950	154	+4.1%
1961	173	+12.3%
1970	160	−7.5%
1980	158	−1.2%
1991	143	−9.5%
2001	156	+9.1%
2011	169	+8.3%
2021	146	−13.6%
Source: Censuses
