= Bohdalec =

- Municipality
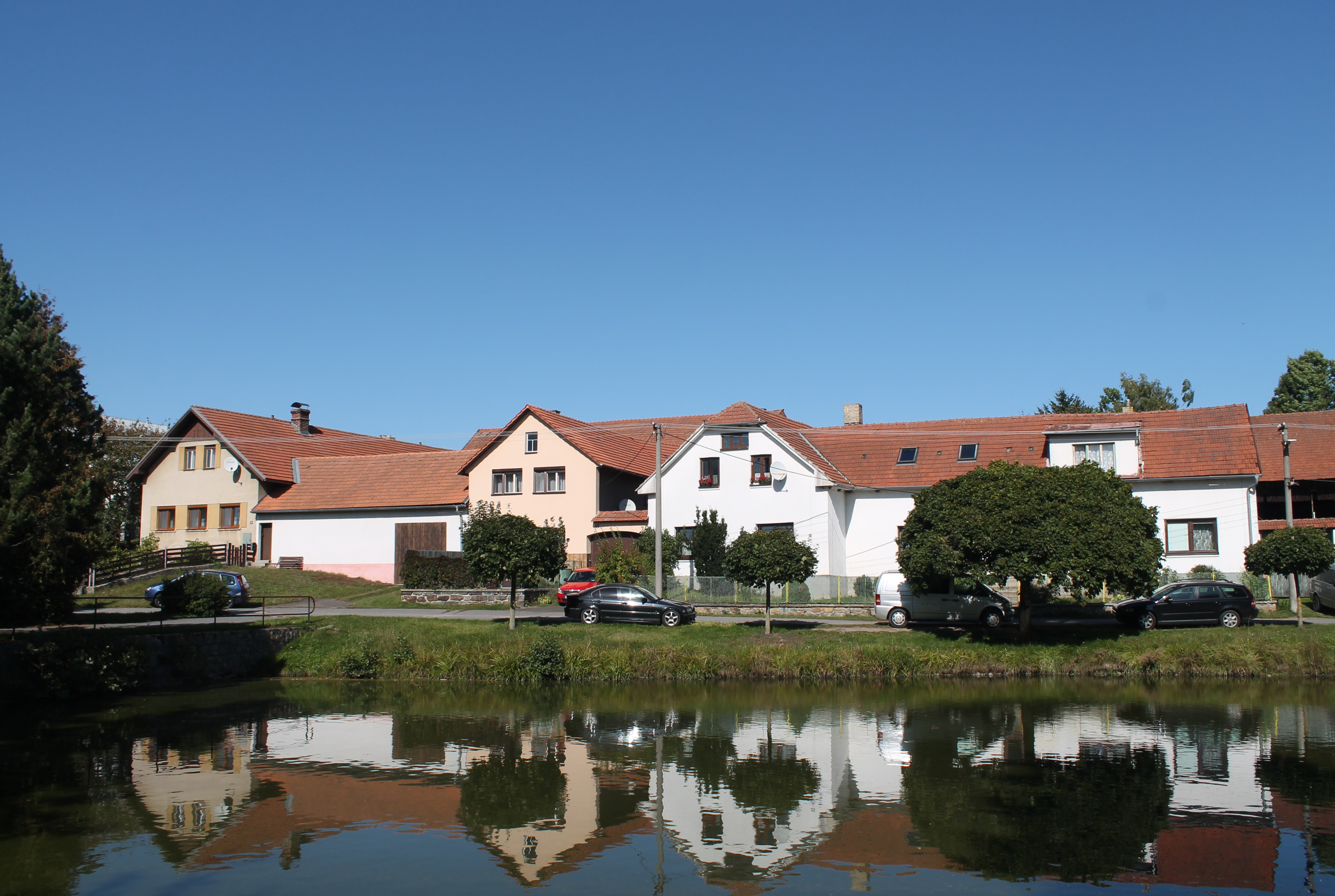
- Centre of Bohdalec

- Flag Coat of arms

- Location in the Czech Republic
- Coordinates: 49°28′28″N 16°3′35″E
- Country: Czech Republic
- Region: Vysočina
- District: Žďár nad Sázavou
- First mentioned: 1252

Area
  - Total: 8.28 km^{2} (3.20 sq mi)
- Elevation: 558 m (1,831 ft)

Population (2026-01-01)
  - Total: 283
  - Density: 34.2/km^{2} (88.5/sq mi)
- Time zone: UTC+1 (CET)
  - Summer (DST): UTC+2 (CEST)
- Postal code: 592 55
- Website: www.obecbohdalec.cz

Bohdalec is a municipality and village in Žďár nad Sázavou District in the Vysočina Region of the Czech Republic. It has about 300 inhabitants.

Bohdalec lies approximately 14 kilometres (9 mi) south-east of Žďár nad Sázavou, 36 km (22 mi) east of Jihlava, and 137 km (85 mi) south-east of Prague.

== Demographics ==
Historical population
Year	Pop.	±%
1869	382	—
1880	420	+9.9%
1890	441	+5.0%
1900	452	+2.5%
1910	437	−3.3%
1921	435	−0.5%
1930	406	−6.7%
1950	344	−15.3%
1961	361	+4.9%
1970	345	−4.4%
1980	312	−9.6%
1991	308	−1.3%
2001	301	−2.3%
2011	280	−7.0%
2021	267	−4.6%
Source: Censuses
