= Baliny =

- Municipality
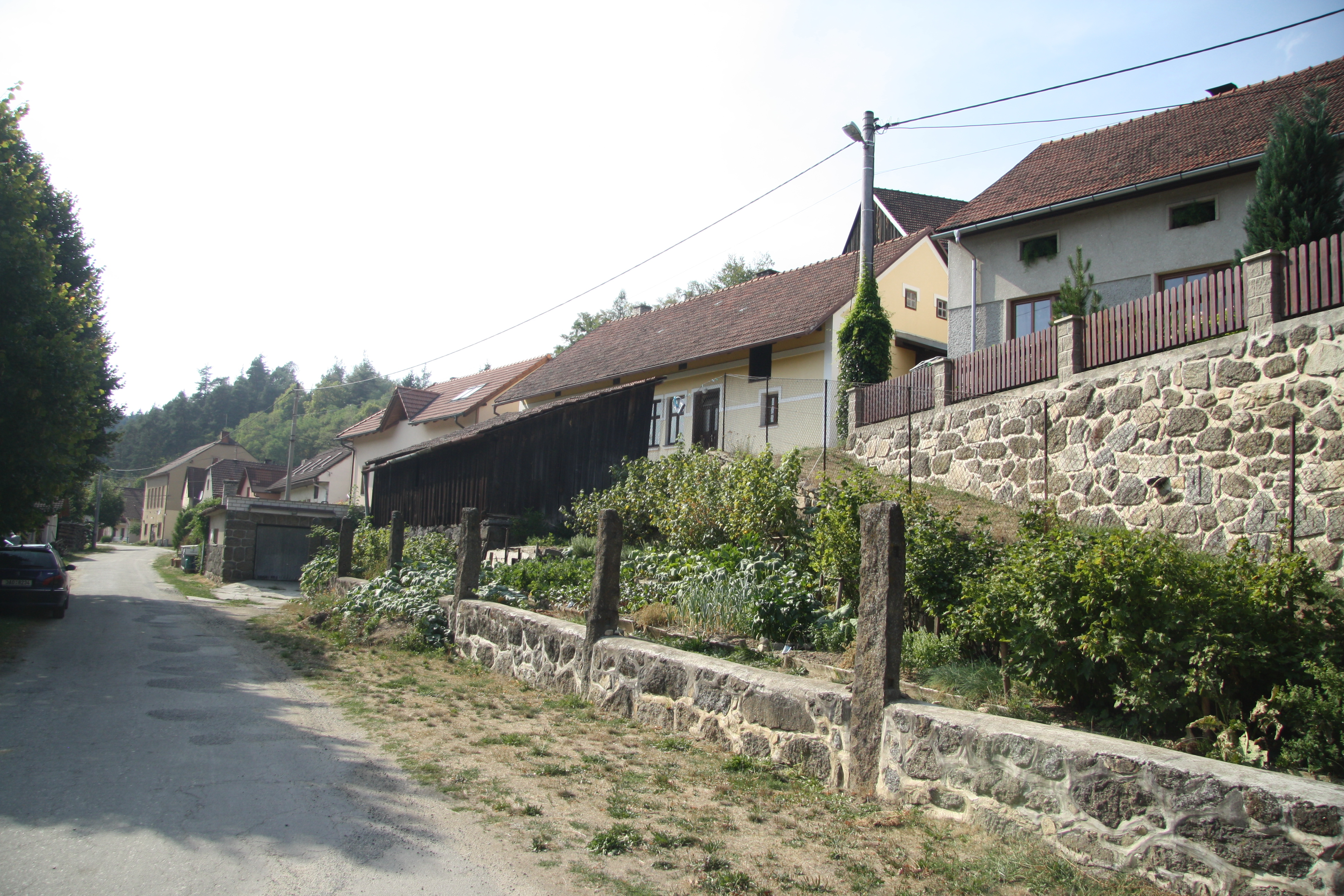
- Lower part of Baliny

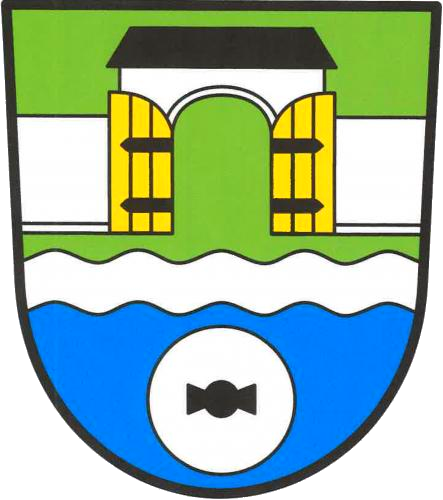
- Flag Coat of arms

- Location in the Czech Republic
- Coordinates: 49°20′8″N 15°57′24″E
- Country: Czech Republic
- Region: Vysočina
- District: Žďár nad Sázavou
- First mentioned: 1358

Area
  - Total: 4.89 km^{2} (1.89 sq mi)
- Elevation: 445 m (1,460 ft)

Population (2026-01-01)
  - Total: 138
  - Density: 28.2/km^{2} (73.1/sq mi)
- Time zone: UTC+1 (CET)
  - Summer (DST): UTC+2 (CEST)
- Postal code: 594 01
- Website: www.baliny.cz

Baliny is a municipality and village in Žďár nad Sázavou District in the Vysočina Region of the Czech Republic. It has about 100 inhabitants.

Baliny lies approximately 26 kilometres (16 mi) south of Žďár nad Sázavou, 28 km (17 mi) east of Jihlava, and 139 km (86 mi) south-east of Prague.

== Demographics ==
Historical population
Year	Pop.	±%
1869	162	—
1880	180	+11.1%
1890	184	+2.2%
1900	202	+9.8%
1910	176	−12.9%
1921	187	+6.2%
1930	208	+11.2%
1950	158	−24.0%
1961	142	−10.1%
1970	124	−12.7%
1980	128	+3.2%
1991	112	−12.5%
2001	124	+10.7%
2011	125	+0.8%
2021	133	+6.4%
Source: Censuses
