= Sazomín =

- Municipality
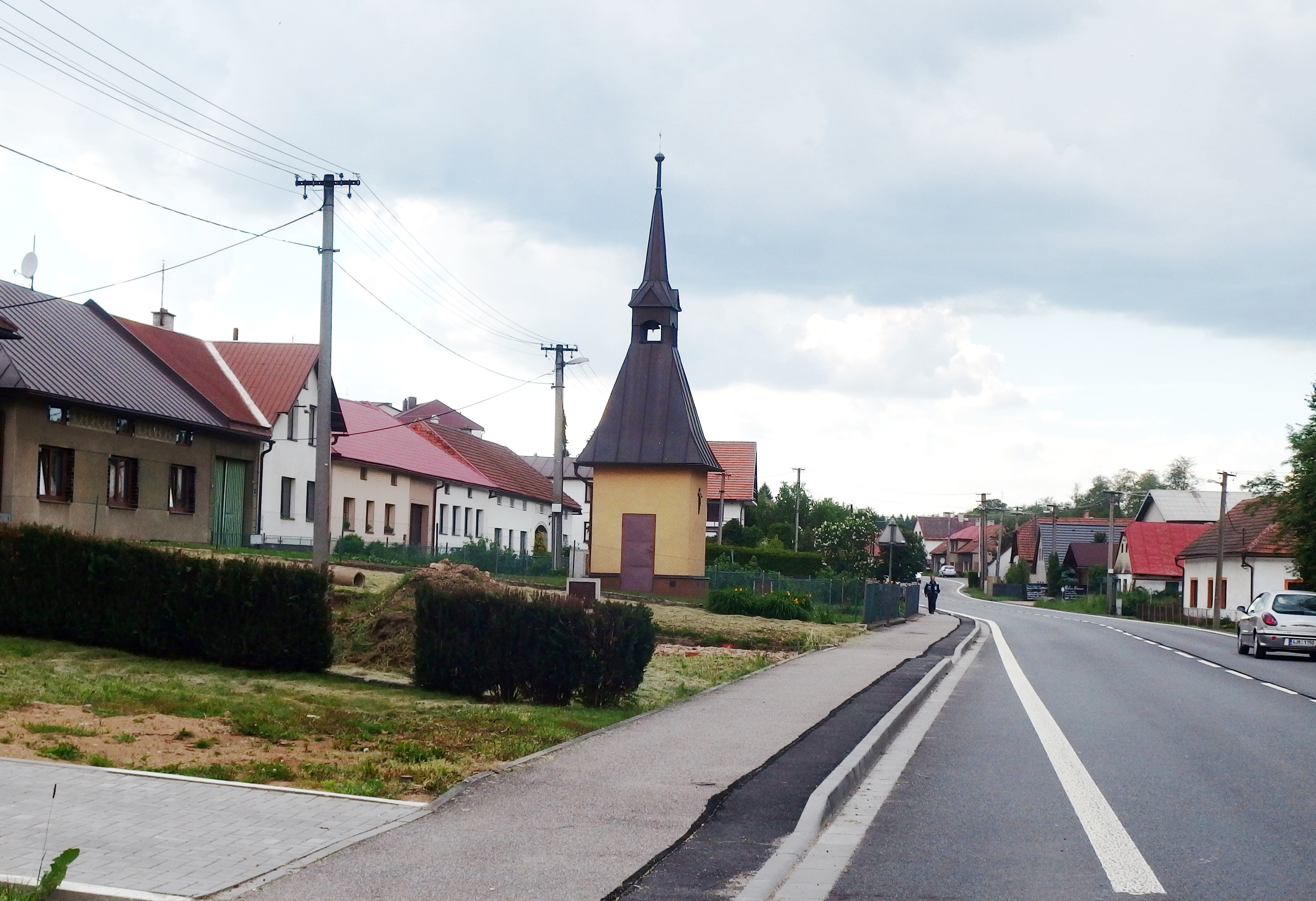
- Belfry by the main road

- Flag Coat of arms

- Location in the Czech Republic
- Coordinates: 49°30′32″N 15°58′52″E
- Country: Czech Republic
- Region: Vysočina
- District: Žďár nad Sázavou
- First mentioned: 1317

Area
  - Total: 5.29 km^{2} (2.04 sq mi)
- Elevation: 528 m (1,732 ft)

Population (2026-01-01)
  - Total: 272
  - Density: 51.4/km^{2} (133/sq mi)
- Time zone: UTC+1 (CET)
  - Summer (DST): UTC+2 (CEST)
- Postal code: 591 01
- Website: www.sazomin.cz

Sazomín is a municipality and village in Žďár nad Sázavou District in the Vysočina Region of the Czech Republic. It has about 300 inhabitants.

Sazomín lies approximately 7 kilometres (4 mi) south of Žďár nad Sázavou, 31 km (19 mi) north-east of Jihlava, and 129 km (80 mi) south-east of Prague.

== Demographics ==
Historical population
| Year | Pop. | ±% |
|---|---|---|
| 1869 | 333 | — |
| 1880 | 327 | −1.8% |
| 1890 | 308 | −5.8% |
| 1900 | 305 | −1.0% |
| 1910 | 310 | +1.6% |
| 1921 | 312 | +0.6% |
| 1930 | 275 | −11.9% |
| 1950 | 259 | −5.8% |
| 1961 | 277 | +6.9% |
| 1970 | 249 | −10.1% |
| 1980 | 243 | −2.4% |
| 1991 | 208 | −14.4% |
| 2001 | 209 | +0.5% |
| 2011 | 219 | +4.8% |
| 2021 | 265 | +21.0% |
Source: Censuses
