= Vidonín =

- Municipality
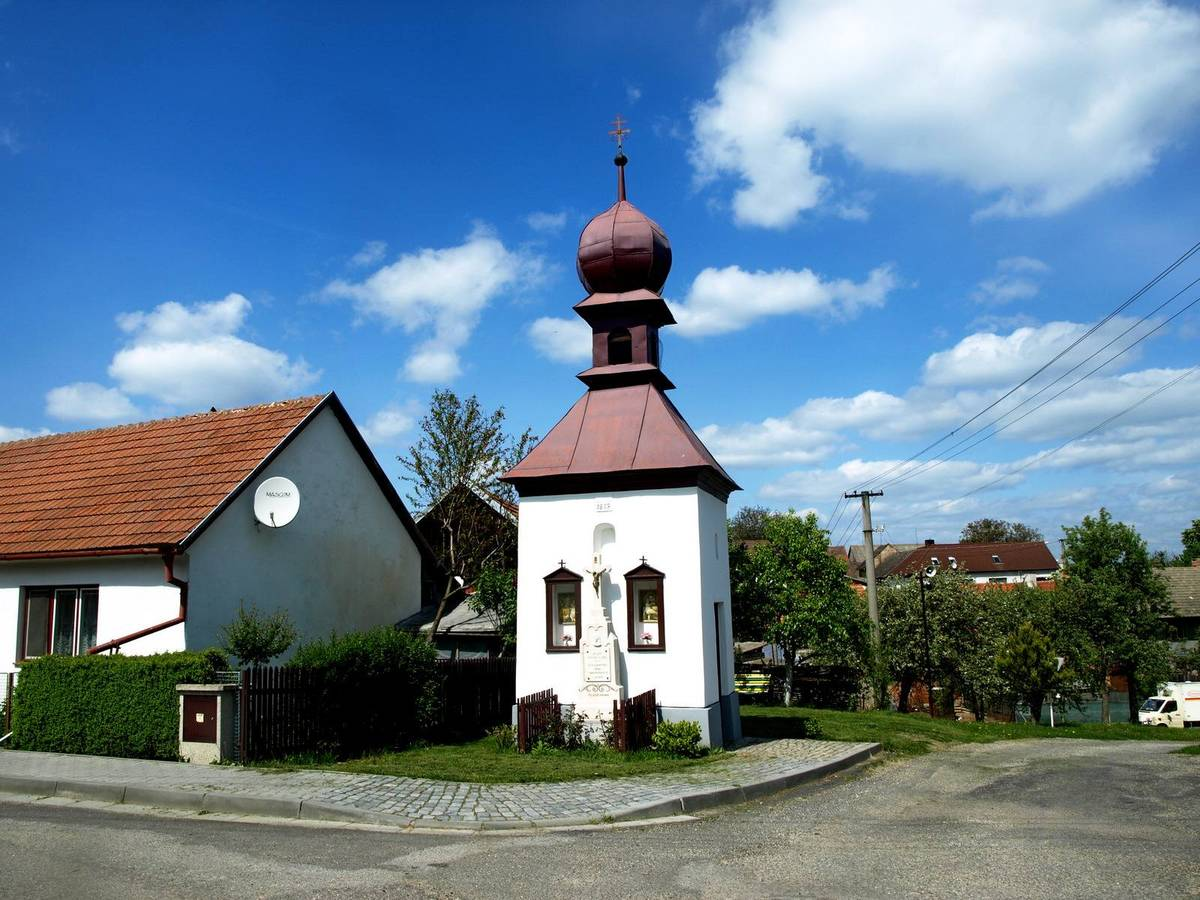
- Chapel in Vidonín

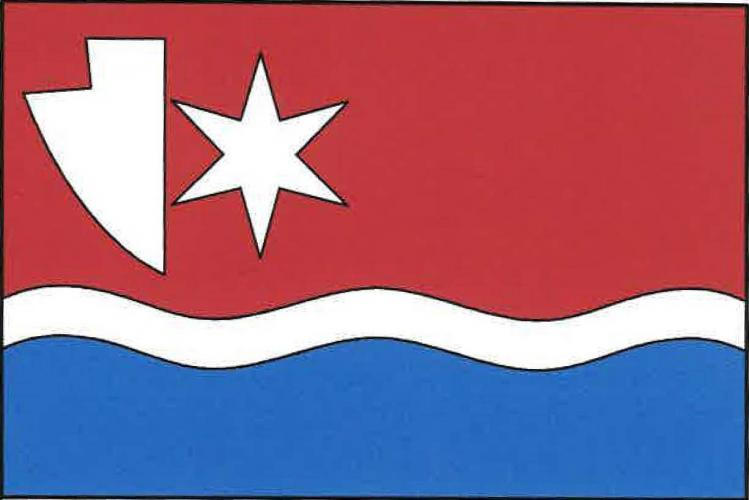
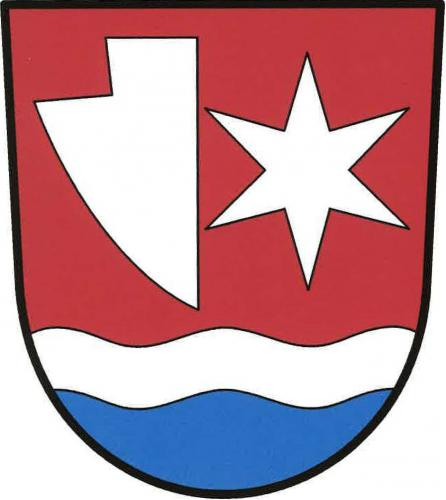
- Flag Coat of arms

- Location in the Czech Republic
- Coordinates: 49°22′47″N 16°13′21″E
- Country: Czech Republic
- Region: Vysočina
- District: Žďár nad Sázavou
- First mentioned: 1354

Area
  - Total: 3.25 km^{2} (1.25 sq mi)
- Elevation: 527 m (1,729 ft)

Population (2026-01-01)
  - Total: 174
  - Density: 53.5/km^{2} (139/sq mi)
- Time zone: UTC+1 (CET)
  - Summer (DST): UTC+2 (CEST)
- Postal code: 594 57
- Website: www.vidonin.cz

Vidonín is a municipality and village in Žďár nad Sázavou District in the Vysočina Region of the Czech Republic. It has about 200 inhabitants.

Vidonín lies approximately 30 kilometres (19 mi) south-east of Žďár nad Sázavou, 46 km (29 mi) east of Jihlava, and 152 km (94 mi) south-east of Prague.

== Demographics ==
Historical population
Year	Pop.	±%
1869	221	—
1880	249	+12.7%
1890	249	+0.0%
1900	218	−12.4%
1910	198	−9.2%
1921	178	−10.1%
1930	272	+52.8%
1950	189	−30.5%
1961	229	+21.2%
1970	218	−4.8%
1980	196	−10.1%
1991	173	−11.7%
2001	169	−2.3%
2011	164	−3.0%
2021	164	+0.0%
Source: Censuses
