= Dlouhé =

- Municipality
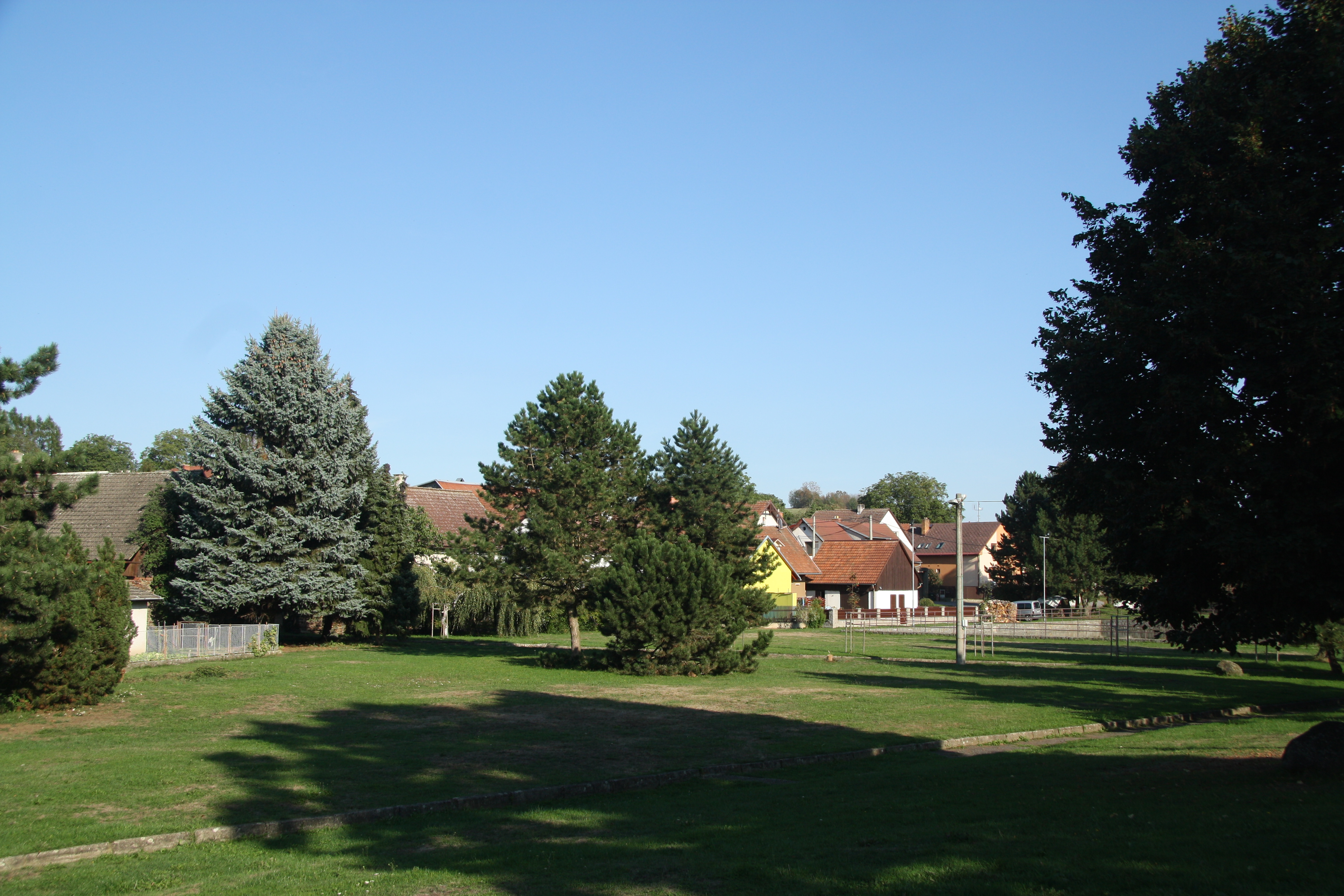
- Centre of Dlouhé

- Flag Coat of arms

- Location in the Czech Republic
- Coordinates: 49°30′32″N 16°7′23″E
- Country: Czech Republic
- Region: Vysočina
- District: Žďár nad Sázavou
- First mentioned: 1407

Area
  - Total: 8.44 km^{2} (3.26 sq mi)
- Elevation: 554 m (1,818 ft)

Population (2026-01-01)
  - Total: 257
  - Density: 30.5/km^{2} (78.9/sq mi)
- Time zone: UTC+1 (CET)
  - Summer (DST): UTC+2 (CEST)
- Postal code: 592 55
- Website: www.obecdlouhe.cz

Dlouhé is a municipality and village in Žďár nad Sázavou District in the Vysočina Region of the Czech Republic. It has about 300 inhabitants.

Dlouhé lies approximately 15 kilometres (9 mi) south-east of Žďár nad Sázavou, 41 km (25 mi) east of Jihlava, and 138 km (86 mi) south-east of Prague.

== Demographics ==
Historical population
Year	Pop.	±%
1869	459	—
1880	432	−5.9%
1890	398	−7.9%
1900	386	−3.0%
1910	415	+7.5%
1921	380	−8.4%
1930	342	−10.0%
1950	293	−14.3%
1961	271	−7.5%
1970	267	−1.5%
1980	300	+12.4%
1991	279	−7.0%
2001	270	−3.2%
2011	255	−5.6%
2021	254	−0.4%
Source: Censuses
