= Malá Losenice =

- Municipality
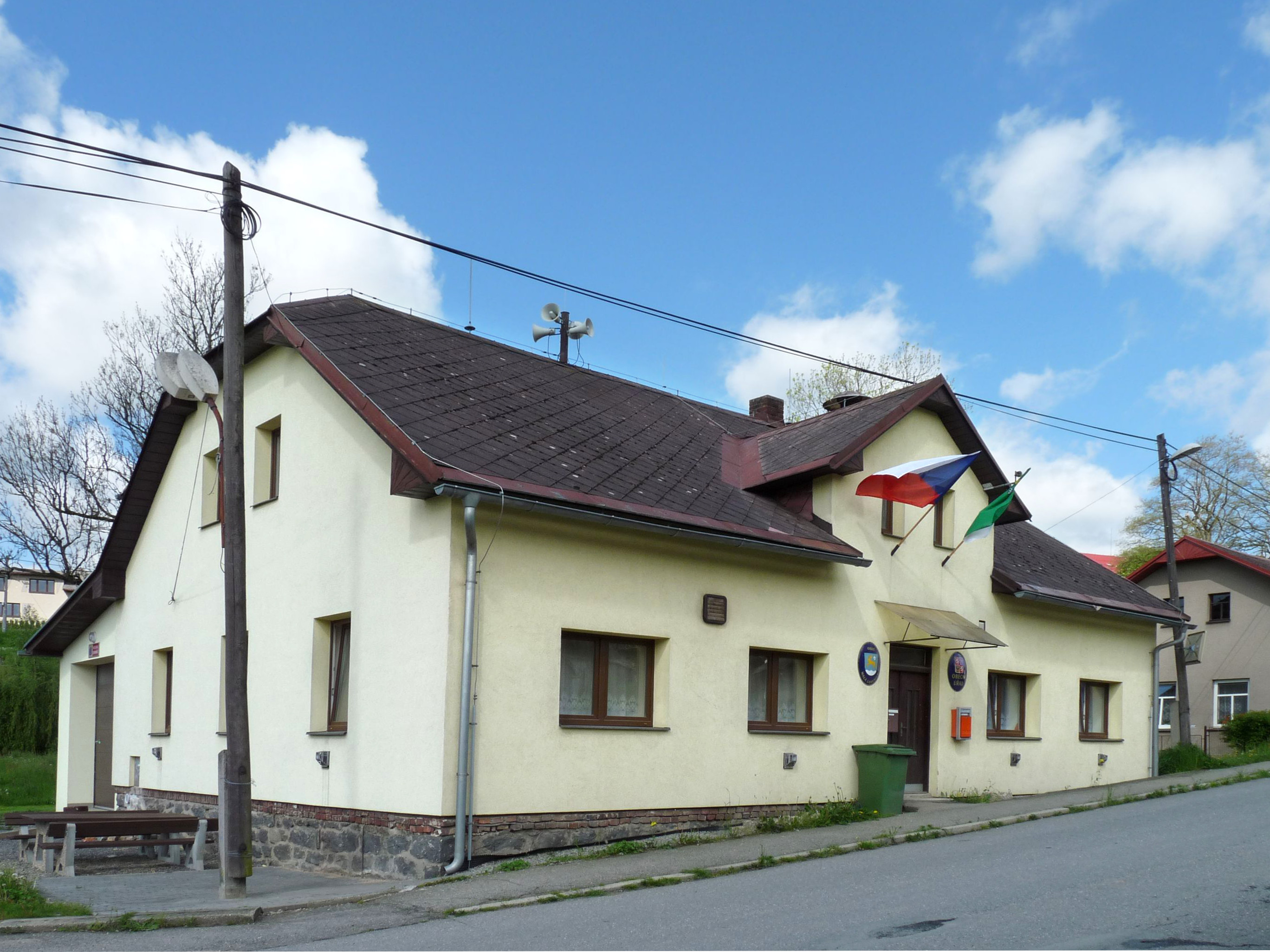
- Municipal office

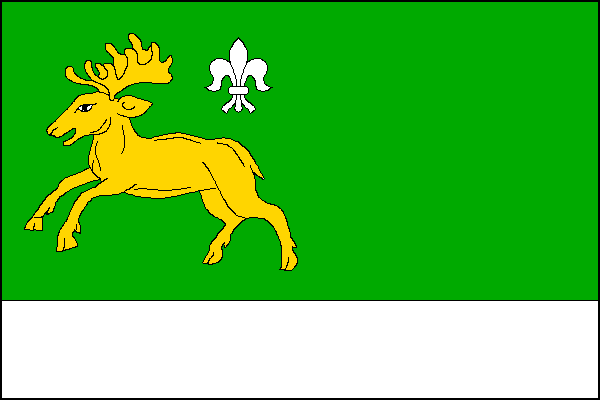
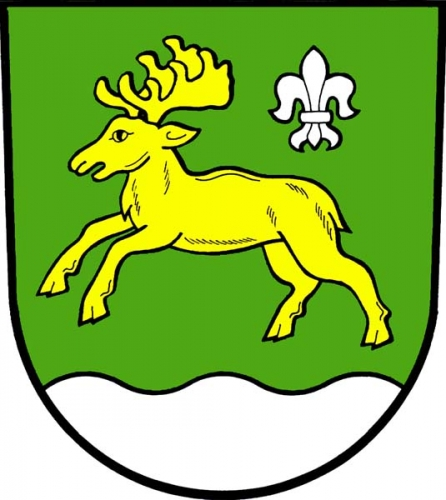
- Flag Coat of arms

- Location in the Czech Republic
- Coordinates: 49°36′0″N 15°47′48″E
- Country: Czech Republic
- Region: Vysočina
- District: Žďár nad Sázavou
- First mentioned: 1352

Area
  - Total: 7.64 km^{2} (2.95 sq mi)
- Elevation: 582 m (1,909 ft)

Population (2026-01-01)
  - Total: 295
  - Density: 38.6/km^{2} (100/sq mi)
- Time zone: UTC+1 (CET)
  - Summer (DST): UTC+2 (CEST)
- Postal code: 592 11
- Website: www.malalosenice.cz

Malá Losenice is a municipality and village in Žďár nad Sázavou District in the Vysočina Region of the Czech Republic. It has about 300 inhabitants.

Malá Losenice lies approximately 11 kilometres (7 mi) west of Žďár nad Sázavou, 28 km (17 mi) north-east of Jihlava, and 114 km (71 mi) south-east of Prague.

== Demographics ==
Historical population
Year	Pop.	±%
1869	541	—
1880	616	+13.9%
1890	601	−2.4%
1900	567	−5.7%
1910	538	−5.1%
1921	526	−2.2%
1930	479	−8.9%
1950	389	−18.8%
1961	389	+0.0%
1970	383	−1.5%
1980	349	−8.9%
1991	300	−14.0%
2001	290	−3.3%
2011	255	−12.1%
2021	258	+1.2%
Source: Censuses
