= Znětínek =

- Municipality
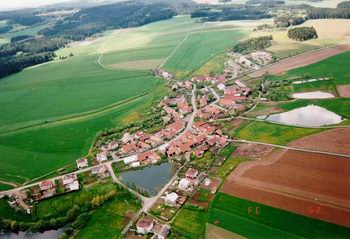
- Aerial view

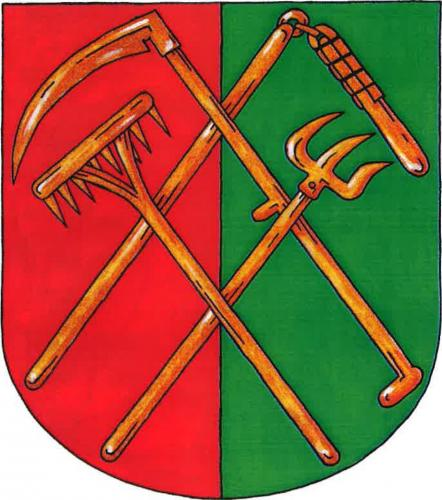
- Flag Coat of arms

- Location in the Czech Republic
- Coordinates: 49°28′11″N 15°55′36″E
- Country: Czech Republic
- Region: Vysočina
- District: Žďár nad Sázavou
- First mentioned: 1370

Area
  - Total: 4.30 km^{2} (1.66 sq mi)
- Elevation: 554 m (1,818 ft)

Population (2026-01-01)
  - Total: 224
  - Density: 52.1/km^{2} (135/sq mi)
- Time zone: UTC+1 (CET)
  - Summer (DST): UTC+2 (CEST)
- Postal code: 594 44
- Website: www.znetinek.cz

Znětínek is a municipality and village in Žďár nad Sázavou District in the Vysočina Region of the Czech Republic. It has about 200 inhabitants.

== Demographics ==
Historical population
Year	Pop.	±%
1869	258	—
1880	245	−5.0%
1890	261	+6.5%
1900	274	+5.0%
1910	250	−8.8%
1921	246	−1.6%
1930	219	−11.0%
1950	211	−3.7%
1961	239	+13.3%
1970	213	−10.9%
1980	210	−1.4%
1991	207	−1.4%
2001	213	+2.9%
2011	207	−2.8%
2021	206	−0.5%
Source: Censuses
