= Žďár nad Sázavou District =

Žďár nad Sázavou District Okres Žďár nad Sázavou
- District
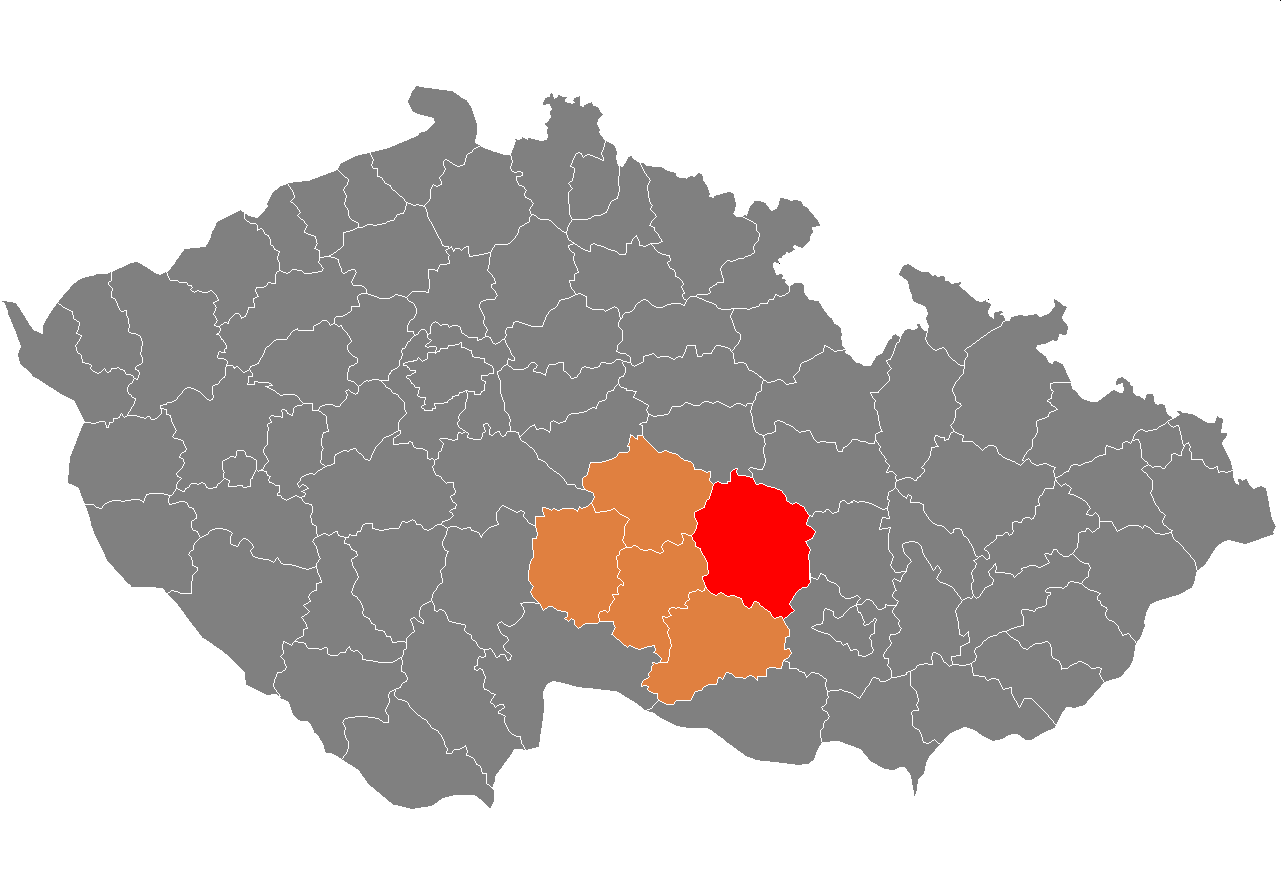
- Location in the Vysočina Region within the Czech Republic
- Coordinates: 49°29′N 16°5′E
- Country: Czech Republic
- Region: Vysočina
- Capital: Žďár nad Sázavou

Area
  - Total: 1,578.67 km^{2} (609.53 sq mi)

Population (2026)
  - Total: 118,771
  - Density: 75.2348/km^{2} (194.857/sq mi)
- Time zone: UTC+1 (CET)
  - Summer (DST): UTC+2 (CEST)
- Municipalities: 174
- * Towns: 6
- * Market towns: 12

Žďár nad Sázavou District (Czech: okres Žďár nad Sázavou) is a district in the Vysočina Region of the Czech Republic. Its capital is the town of Žďár nad Sázavou.

== Administrative division ==
Žďár nad Sázavou District is divided into four administrative districts of municipalities with extended competence: Žďár nad Sázavou, Bystřice nad Pernštejnem, Nové Město na Moravě and Velké Meziříčí.

=== List of municipalities ===
Towns are marked in bold and market towns in italics:

Baliny - Blažkov - Blízkov - Bobrová - Bobrůvka - Bohdalec - Bohdalov - Bohuňov - Borovnice - Bory - Březejc - Březí nad Oslavou - Březí - Březské - Budeč - Bukov - Býšovec - Bystřice nad Pernštejnem - Černá - Chlumek - Chlumětín - Chlum-Korouhvice - Cikháj - Dalečín - Daňkovice - Dlouhé - Dobrá Voda - Dolní Heřmanice - Dolní Libochová - Dolní Rožínka - Fryšava pod Žákovou horou - Hamry nad Sázavou - Herálec - Heřmanov - Hodíškov - Horní Libochová - Horní Radslavice - Horní Rožínka - Jabloňov - Jámy - Javorek - Jimramov - Jívoví - Kadolec - Kadov - Karlov - Kněževes - Koroužné - Kotlasy - Kozlov - Krásné - Krásněves - Křídla - Křižánky - Křižanov - Křoví - Kuklík - Kundratice - Kyjov - Lavičky - Lhotka - Lísek - Líšná - Malá Losenice - Martinice - Matějov - Měřín - Meziříčko - Milasín - Milešín - Mirošov - Moravec - Moravecké Pavlovice - Netín - Nížkov - Nová Ves - Nová Ves u Nového Města na Moravě - Nové Dvory - Nové Město na Moravě - Nové Sady - Nové Veselí - Nový Jimramov - Nyklovice - Obyčtov - Ořechov - Oslavice - Osová Bítýška - Osové - Ostrov nad Oslavou - Otín - Pavlínov - Pavlov - Petráveč - Pikárec - Písečné - Počítky - Poděšín - Podolí - Pokojov - Polnička - Prosetín - Račice - Račín - Radenice - Radešín - Radešínská Svratka - Radkov - Radňoves - Radňovice - Radostín nad Oslavou - Radostín - Řečice - Rodkov - Rosička - Rousměrov - Rovečné - Rožná - Rozseč - Rozsochy - Ruda - Rudolec - Sázava - Sazomín - Sejřek - Sirákov - Sklené - Sklené nad Oslavou - Skorotice - Škrdlovice - Skřinářov - Sněžné - Spělkov - Štěpánov nad Svratkou - Strachujov - Stránecká Zhoř - Strážek - Střítež - Sulkovec - Světnov - Sviny - Svratka - Tasov - Tři Studně - Ubušínek - Uhřínov - Ujčov - Újezd - Unčín - Vatín - Věchnov - Věcov - Velká Bíteš - Velká Losenice - Velké Janovice - Velké Meziříčí - Velké Tresné - Vepřová - Věstín - Věžná - Vídeň - Vidonín - Vír - Vlachovice - Vlkov - Vojnův Městec - Vysoké - Záblatí - Zadní Zhořec - Ždánice - Žďár nad Sázavou - Znětínek - Zubří - Zvole

== Geography ==
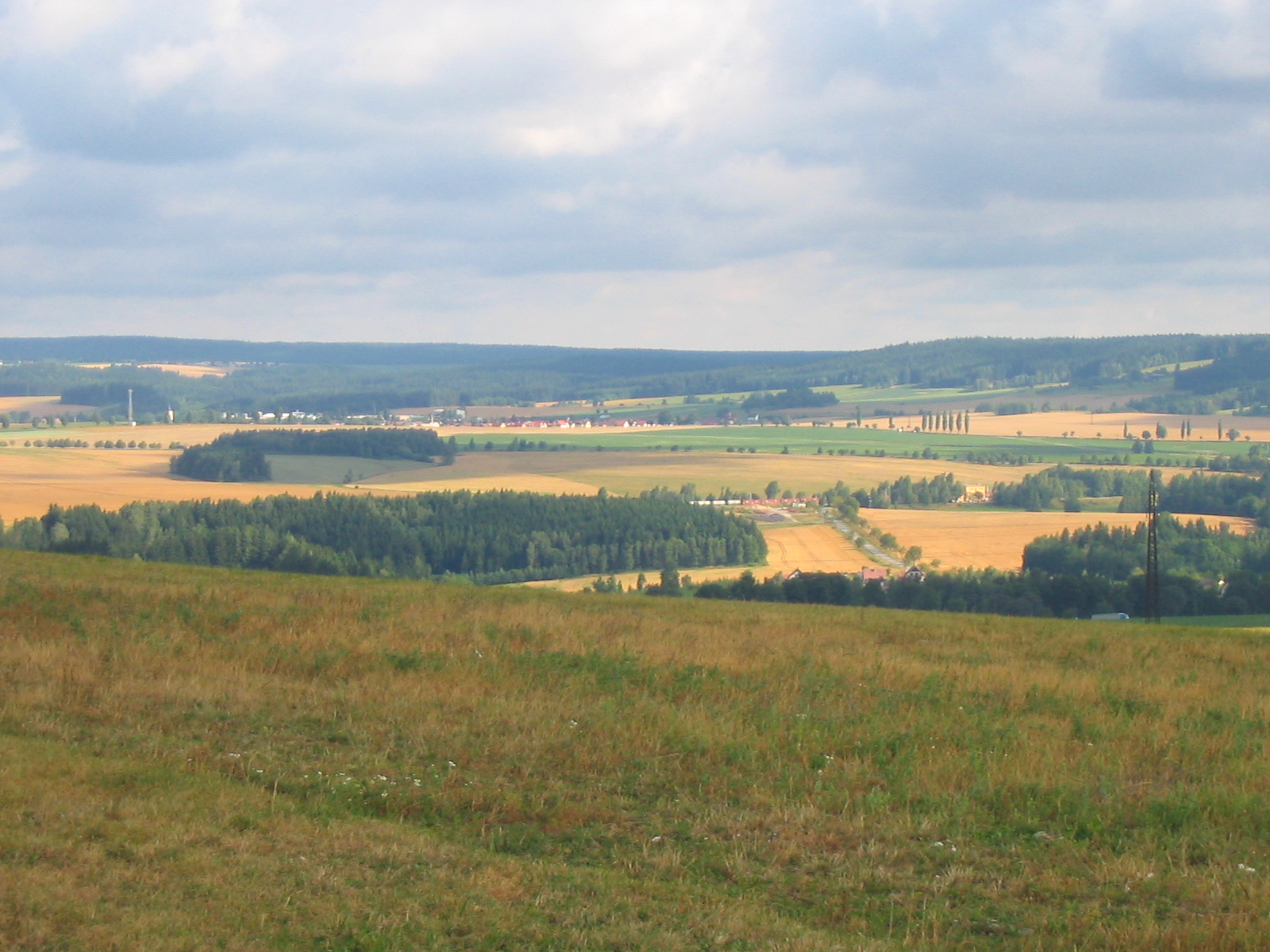
Landscape west of Žďár nad Sázavou

The landscape is rugged and diverse, with above-average elevations compared to the rest of the country. The territory extends into three geomorphological mesoregions: Křižanov Highlands (most of the territory), Upper Svratka Highlands (north and east) and Upper Sázava Hills (smalls part in the west). The highest point of the district is the mountain Devět skal in Křižánky with an elevation of 836 m (2,743 ft), the lowest point is the river bed of the Bobrůvka in Strážek at 370 m (1,210 ft).

From the total district area of 1,578.7 km^{2} (609.5 sq mi), agricultural land occupies 874.7 km^{2} (337.7 sq mi), forests occupy 552.2 km^{2} (213.2 sq mi), and water area occupies 33.6 km^{2} (13.0 sq mi). Forests cover 35.0% of the district's area.

There are several important rivers that originates here (in the area of Žďárské vrchy) and drain the territory. The Sázava flows through the north and west. The Svratka originates near the Sázava and flows through the north and east. The Oslava flows through the central part of the district to the south. The Doubrava River originates here, but soon leaves the district. Other notable watercourses are the Bobrůvka and Balinka.

The territory is rich in bodies of water. The largest body of water is Vír I Reservoir. The largest pond is Velké Dářko, which is also the largest pond of the whole Vysočina Region.

Žďárské vrchy is the only protected landscape area in the district. It covers the northern part of the district.

== Demographics ==
Historical population

Year	Pop.	±%
1869	113,125	—
1880	115,173	+1.8%
1890	112,020	−2.7%
1900	110,485	−1.4%
1910	110,497	+0.0%

Year	Pop.	±%
1921	107,445	−2.8%
1930	105,212	−2.1%
1950	92,023	−12.5%
1961	101,847	+10.7%
1970	109,221	+7.2%

Year	Pop.	±%
1980	117,051	+7.2%
1991	118,841	+1.5%
2001	119,627	+0.7%
2011	117,219	−2.0%
2021	114,648	−2.2%

Source: Censuses

=== Most populous municipalities ===
Name	Population	Area (km^{2})
Žďár nad Sázavou	20,247	37
Velké Meziříčí	11,709	41
Nové Město na Moravě	9,716	61
Bystřice nad Pernštejnem	7,851	53
Velká Bíteš	5,535	47
Měřín	2,009	18
Křižanov	1,811	14
Hamry nad Sázavou	1,568	7
Nové Veselí	1,369	10
Svratka	1,358	15

== Economy ==
The largest employers with headquarters in Žďár nad Sázavou District and at least 500 employees are:

Economic entity	Location	Number of employees	Main activity
ŽĎAS	Žďár nad Sázavou	1,500–1,999	Casting of metals
Wera Werk	Bystřice nad Pernštejnem	1,000–1,499	Manufacture of tools
Nové Město na Moravě Hospital	Nové Město na Moravě	1,000–1,499	Health care
ITW Pronovia	Velká Bíteš	1,000–1,499	Manufacture of components
První brněnská strojírna	Velká Bíteš	500–999	Manufacture of equipment for aviation
Cooper-Standard Automotive ČR	Žďár nad Sázavou	500–999	Manufacture of parts for motor vehicles
Hettich ČR	Žďár nad Sázavou	500–999	Manufacture of furniture fittings
ZDAR	Žďár nad Sázavou	500–999	Freight transport by road

== Transport ==
The D1 motorway from Prague to Brno passes through the southern part of the district.

== Sights ==
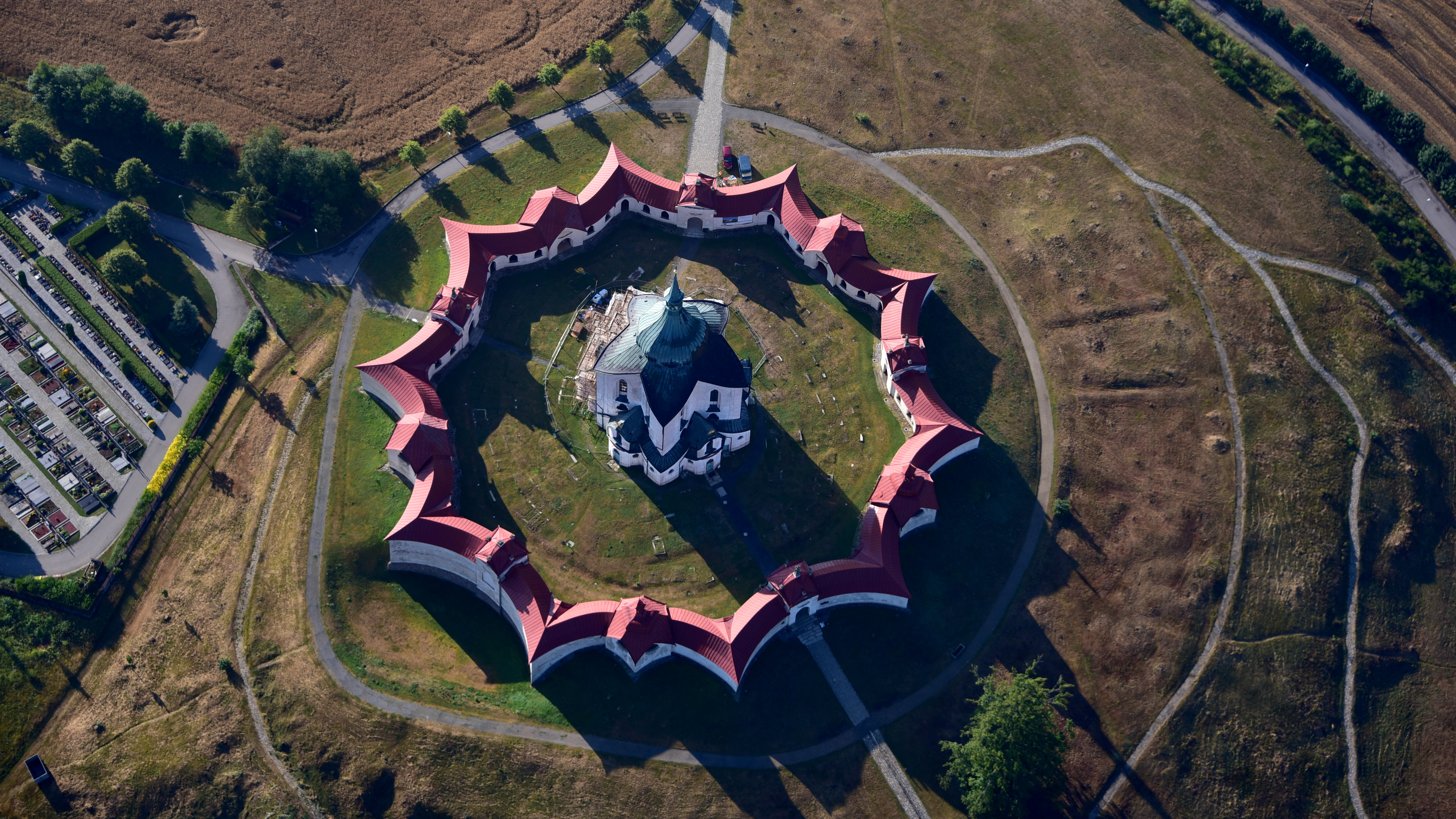
Church of Saint John of Nepomuk

The pilgrimage Church of Saint John of Nepomuk in Žďár nad Sázavou was designated a UNESCO World Heritage Site in 1994 because of its unique architectural style, created by architect Jan Santini Aichel. It is the most important monument in the district and also the only monument protected as a national cultural monument.

The best-preserved settlements, protected as monument reservations and monument zones, are:

- Krátká (monument reservation)
- Křižánky (monument reservation)
- Jimramov
- Nové Město na Moravě
- Velká Bíteš
- Velké Meziříčí
- Ubušínek

The most visited tourist destinations are the water park Relaxační centrum Žďár nad Sázavou, town spa in Nové Město na Moravě, the western town Šikland in Zvole, and Žďár nad Sázavou Castle.
