= Jívoví =

- Municipality
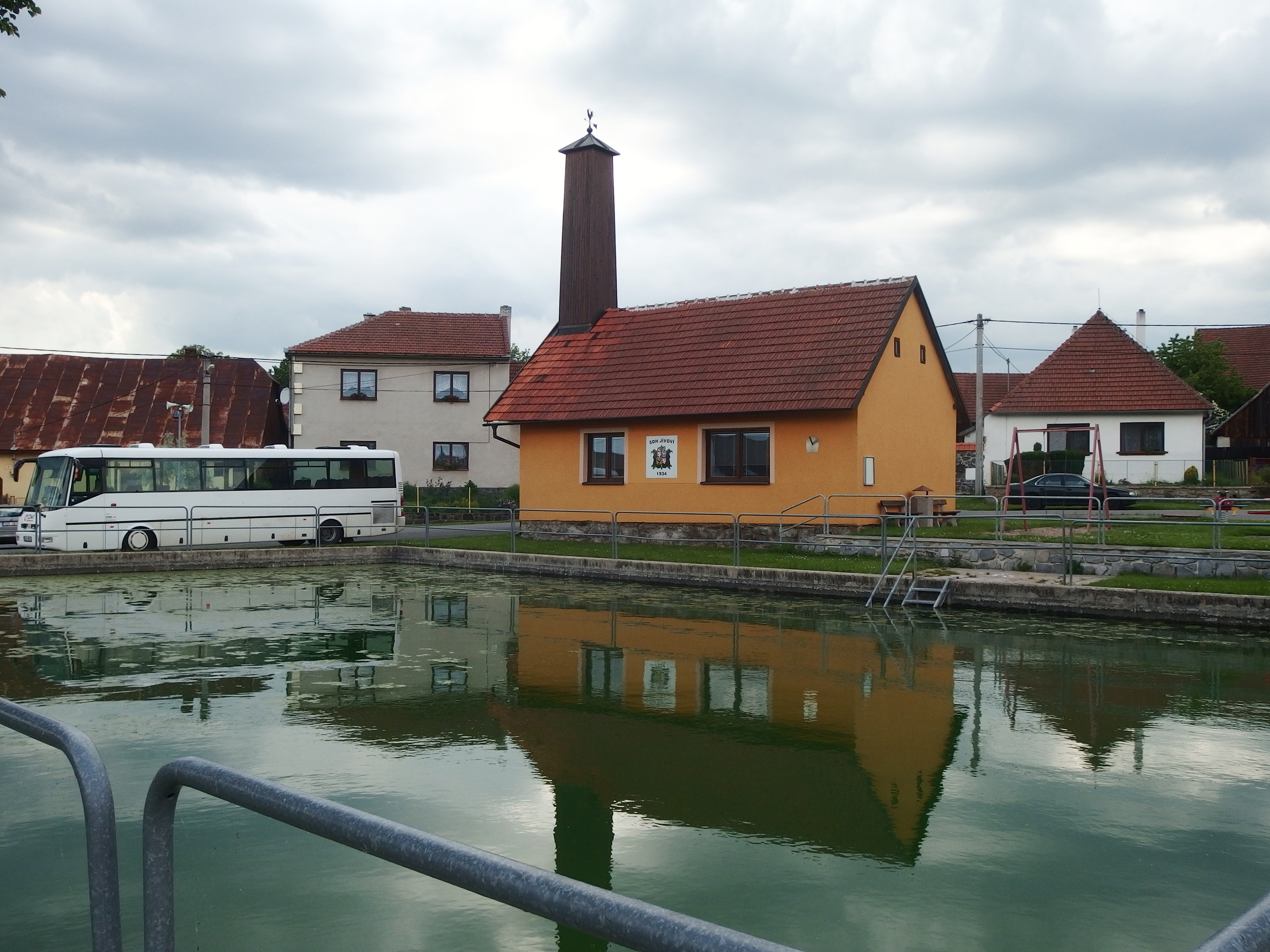
- Water tank and firehouse

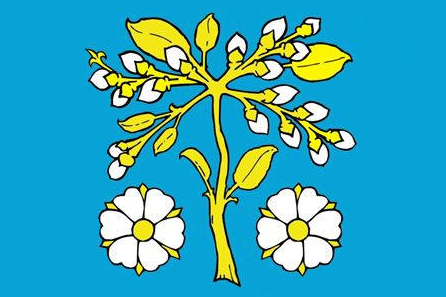
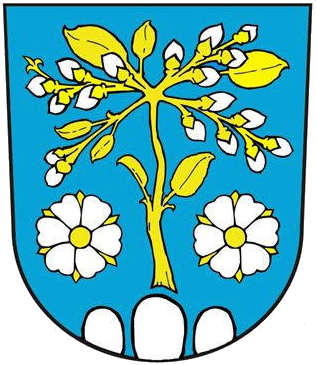
- Flag Coat of arms

- Location in the Czech Republic
- Coordinates: 49°24′19″N 16°5′27″E
- Country: Czech Republic
- Region: Vysočina
- District: Žďár nad Sázavou
- First mentioned: 1200

Area
  - Total: 7.69 km^{2} (2.97 sq mi)
- Elevation: 550 m (1,800 ft)

Population (2026-01-01)
  - Total: 291
  - Density: 37.8/km^{2} (98.0/sq mi)
- Time zone: UTC+1 (CET)
  - Summer (DST): UTC+2 (CEST)
- Postal code: 594 51
- Website: www.jivovi.cz

Jívoví is a municipality and village in Žďár nad Sázavou District in the Vysočina Region of the Czech Republic. It has about 300 inhabitants.

Jívoví lies approximately 21 kilometres (13 mi) south-east of Žďár nad Sázavou, 37 km (23 mi) east of Jihlava, and 142 km (88 mi) south-east of Prague.

== Demographics ==
Historical population
Year	Pop.	±%
1869	423	—
1880	431	+1.9%
1890	397	−7.9%
1900	370	−6.8%
1910	362	−2.2%
1921	347	−4.1%
1930	347	+0.0%
1950	354	+2.0%
1961	380	+7.3%
1970	355	−6.6%
1980	326	−8.2%
1991	319	−2.1%
2001	303	−5.0%
2011	288	−5.0%
2021	275	−4.5%
Source: Censuses
