= Milasín =

- Municipality
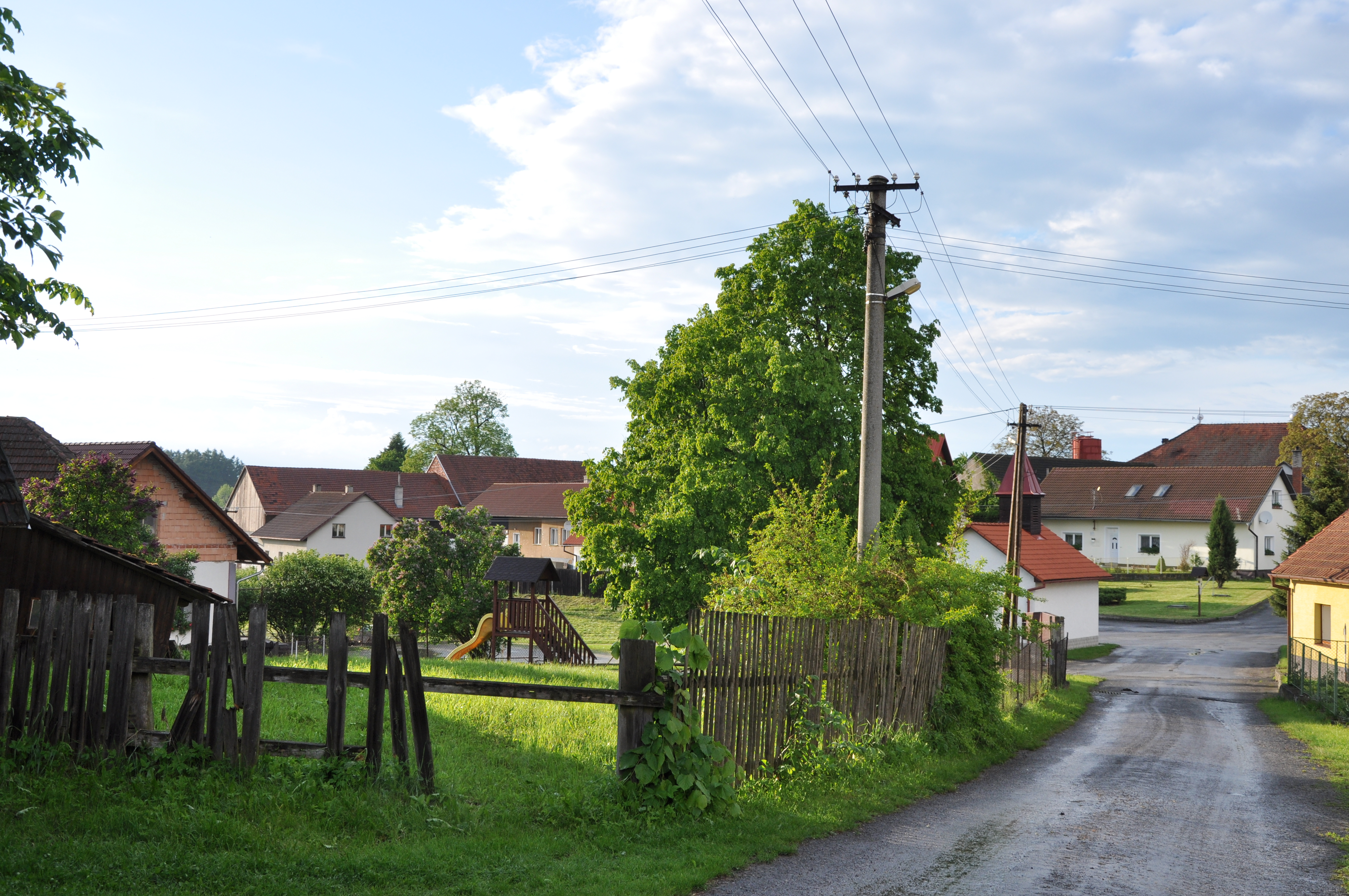
- Centre of Milasín

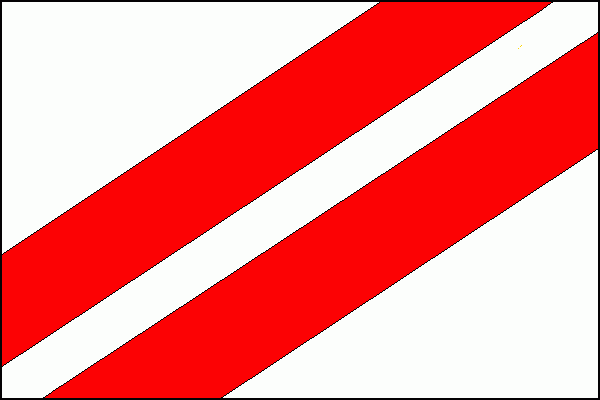
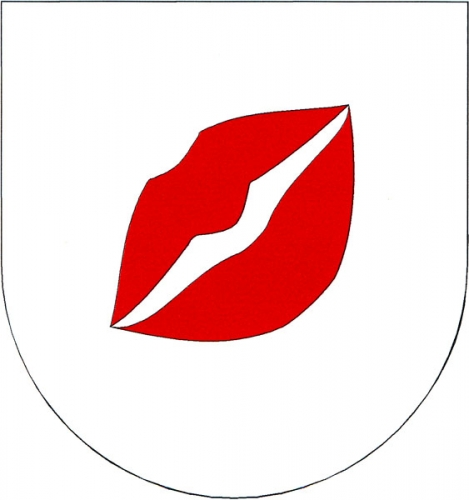
- Flag Coat of arms

- Location in the Czech Republic
- Coordinates: 49°27′59″N 16°13′44″E
- Country: Czech Republic
- Region: Vysočina
- District: Žďár nad Sázavou
- First mentioned: 1348

Area
  - Total: 2.18 km^{2} (0.84 sq mi)
- Elevation: 547 m (1,795 ft)

Population (2026-01-01)
  - Total: 50
  - Density: 23/km^{2} (59/sq mi)
- Time zone: UTC+1 (CET)
  - Summer (DST): UTC+2 (CEST)
- Postal code: 592 51
- Website: www.milasin.cz

Milasín is a municipality and village in Žďár nad Sázavou District in the Vysočina Region of the Czech Republic. It has about 50 inhabitants.

Milasín lies approximately 24 kilometres (15 mi) south-east of Žďár nad Sázavou, 48 km (30 mi) east of Jihlava, and 148 km (92 mi) south-east of Prague.

== Demographics ==
Historical population
Year	Pop.	±%
1869	146	—
1880	143	−2.1%
1890	155	+8.4%
1900	142	−8.4%
1910	132	−7.0%
1921	136	+3.0%
1930	148	+8.8%
1950	83	−43.9%
1961	86	+3.6%
1970	66	−23.3%
1980	69	+4.5%
1991	52	−24.6%
2001	50	−3.8%
2011	46	−8.0%
2021	48	+4.3%
Source: Censuses
