= Kadolec =

- Municipality
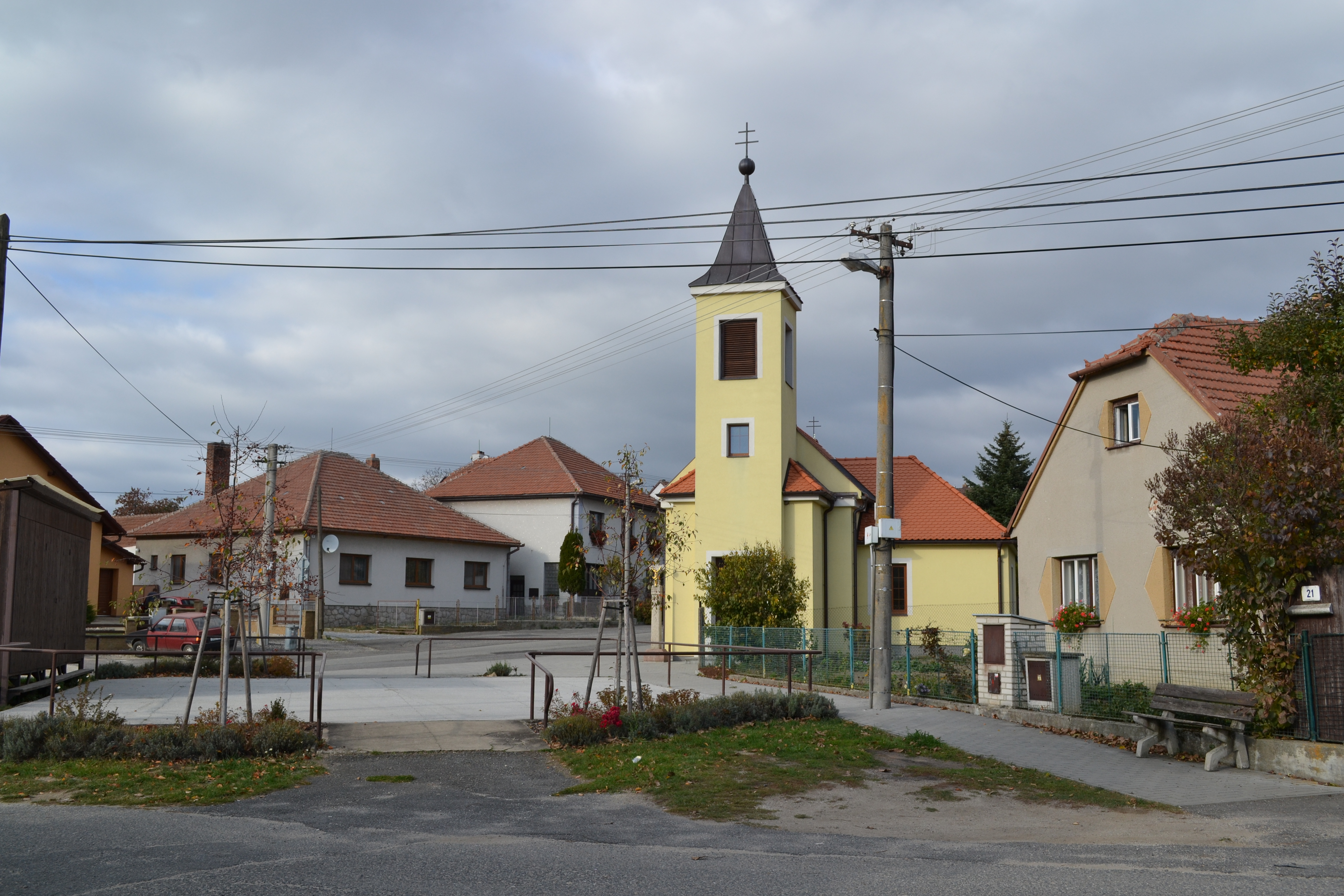
- Centre of Kadolec

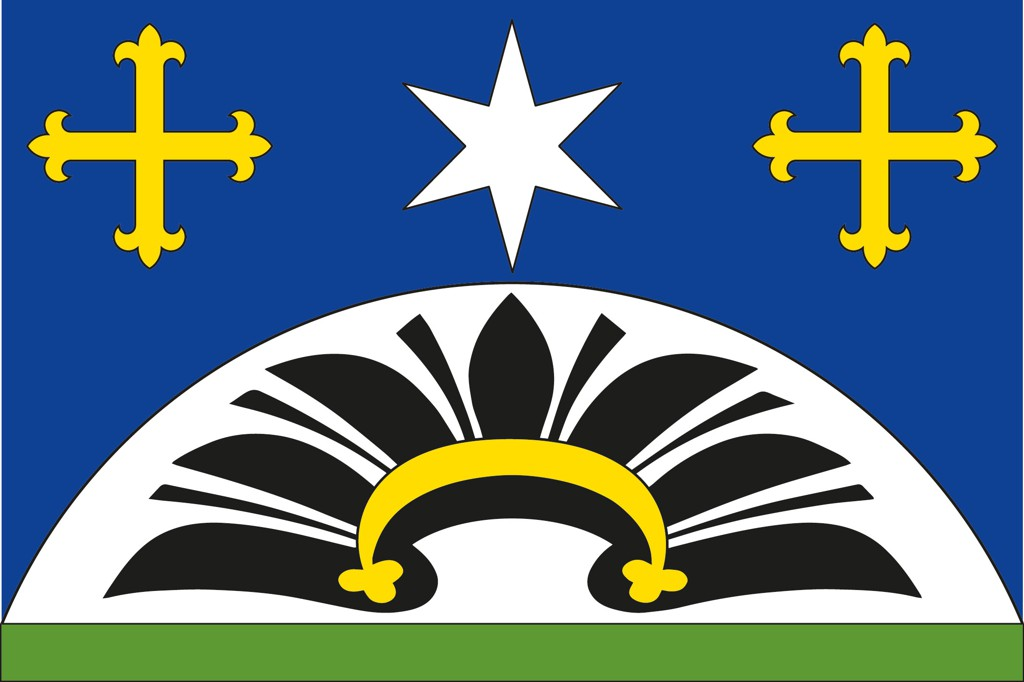
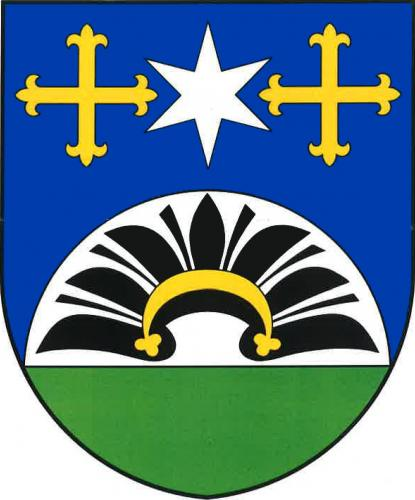
- Flag Coat of arms

- Location in the Czech Republic
- Coordinates: 49°22′29″N 16°8′30″E
- Country: Czech Republic
- Region: Vysočina
- District: Žďár nad Sázavou
- First mentioned: 1364

Area
  - Total: 6.08 km^{2} (2.35 sq mi)
- Elevation: 595 m (1,952 ft)

Population (2026-01-01)
  - Total: 168
  - Density: 27.6/km^{2} (71.6/sq mi)
- Time zone: UTC+1 (CET)
  - Summer (DST): UTC+2 (CEST)
- Postal code: 594 51
- Website: www.kadolec.cz

Kadolec is a municipality and village in Žďár nad Sázavou District in the Vysočina Region of the Czech Republic. It has about 200 inhabitants.

Kadolec lies approximately 26 kilometres (16 mi) south-east of Žďár nad Sázavou, 40 km (25 mi) east of Jihlava, and 147 km (91 mi) south-east of Prague.

== Demographics ==
Historical population
Year	Pop.	±%
1869	360	—
1880	371	+3.1%
1890	349	−5.9%
1900	312	−10.6%
1910	300	−3.8%
1921	274	−8.7%
1930	273	−0.4%
1950	240	−12.1%
1961	220	−8.3%
1970	227	+3.2%
1980	205	−9.7%
1991	164	−20.0%
2001	165	+0.6%
2011	154	−6.7%
2021	172	+11.7%
Source: Censuses
