= Nový Jimramov =

- Municipality
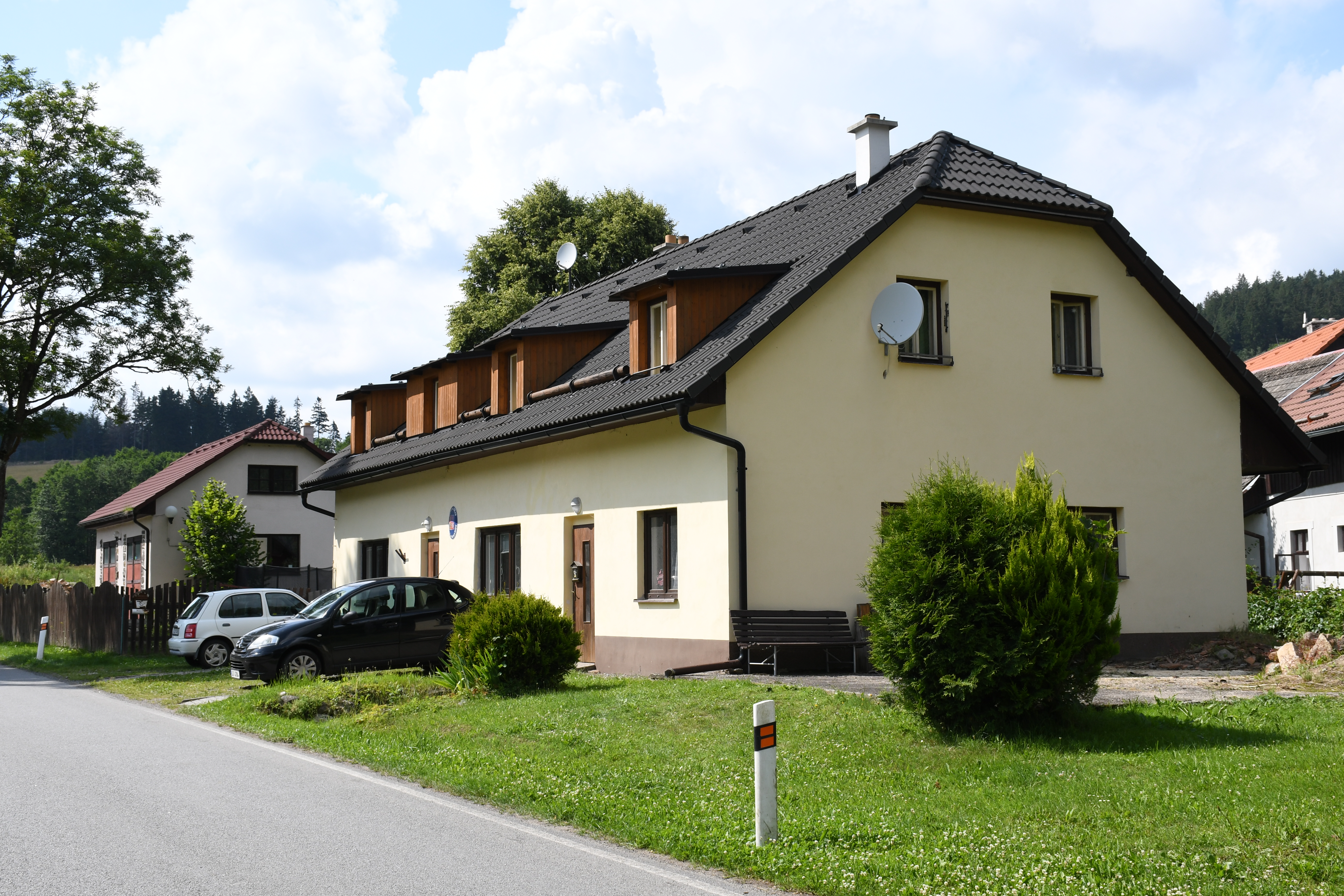
- Municipal office

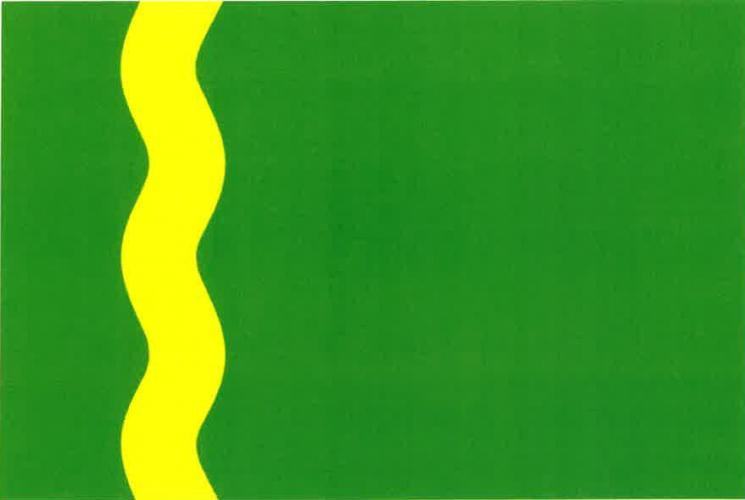
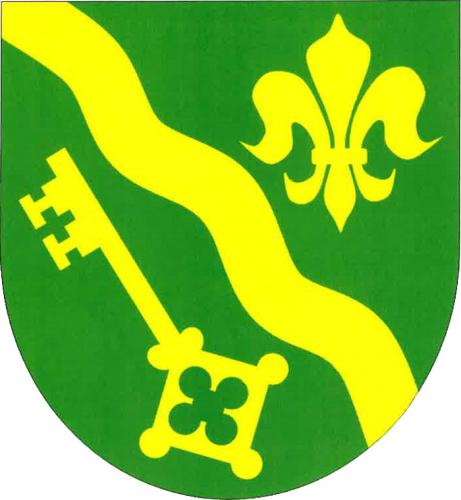
- Flag Coat of arms

- Location in the Czech Republic
- Coordinates: 49°38′5″N 16°11′14″E
- Country: Czech Republic
- Region: Vysočina
- District: Žďár nad Sázavou
- First mentioned: 1660

Area
  - Total: 4.25 km^{2} (1.64 sq mi)
- Elevation: 538 m (1,765 ft)

Population (2026-01-01)
  - Total: 56
  - Density: 13/km^{2} (34/sq mi)
- Time zone: UTC+1 (CET)
  - Summer (DST): UTC+2 (CEST)
- Postal code: 592 42
- Website: www.novyjimramov.cz

Nový Jimramov (German: Neu Ingrowitz) is a municipality and village in Žďár nad Sázavou District in the Vysočina Region of the Czech Republic. It has about 60 inhabitants.

Nový Jimramov lies approximately 20 kilometres (12 mi) north-east of Žďár nad Sázavou, 51 km (32 mi) north-east of Jihlava, and 136 km (85 mi) east of Prague.

== Administrative division ==
Nový Jimramov consists of three municipal parts (in brackets population according to the 2021 census):

- Nový Jimramov (38)
- Jimramovské Paseky (17)
- Široké Pole (6)

== Demographics ==
Historical population
Year	Pop.	±%
1869	434	—
1880	386	−11.1%
1890	355	−8.0%
1900	381	+7.3%
1910	385	+1.0%
1921	326	−15.3%
1930	282	−13.5%
1950	190	−32.6%
1961	180	−5.3%
1970	138	−23.3%
1980	96	−30.4%
1991	93	−3.1%
2001	76	−18.3%
2011	65	−14.5%
2021	61	−6.2%
Source: Censuses
