= Skřinářov =

- Municipality
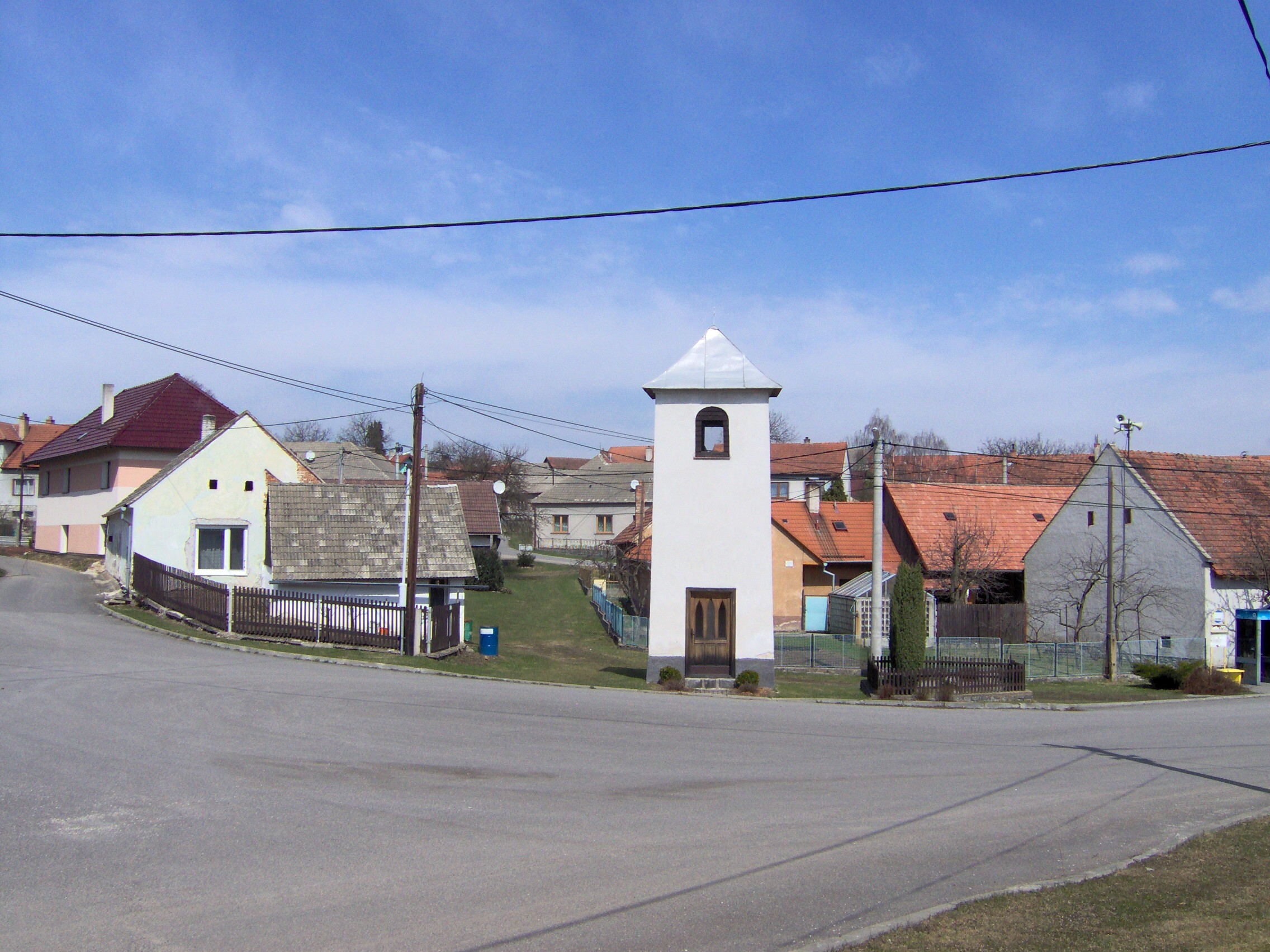
- Centre of Skřinářov

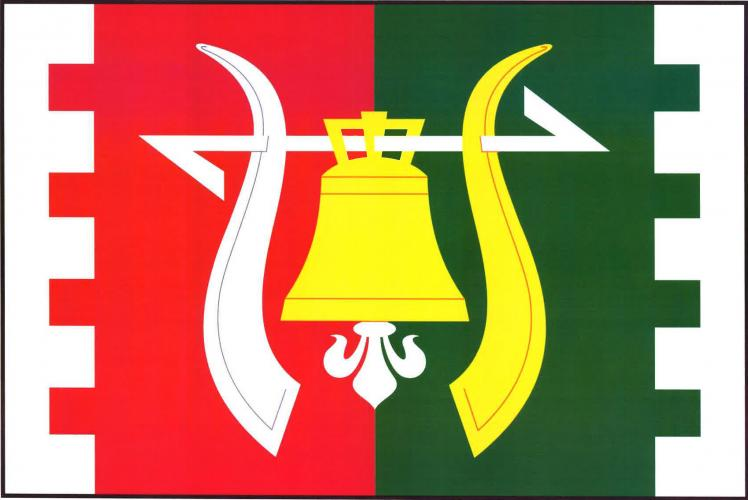
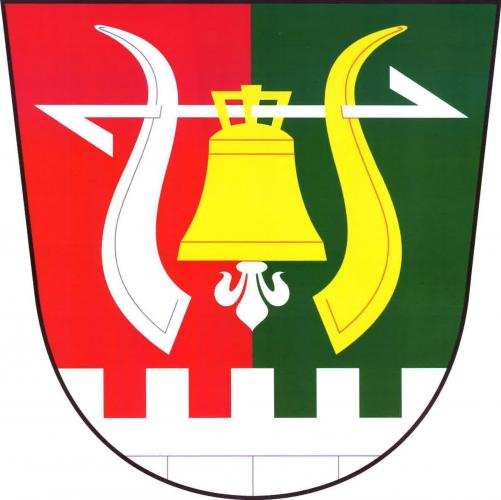
- Flag Coat of arms

- Location in the Czech Republic
- Coordinates: 49°20′50″N 16°10′19″E
- Country: Czech Republic
- Region: Vysočina
- District: Žďár nad Sázavou
- First mentioned: 1364

Area
  - Total: 8.98 km^{2} (3.47 sq mi)
- Elevation: 560 m (1,840 ft)

Population (2026-01-01)
  - Total: 147
  - Density: 16.4/km^{2} (42.4/sq mi)
- Time zone: UTC+1 (CET)
  - Summer (DST): UTC+2 (CEST)
- Postal code: 594 53
- Website: obecskrinarov.cz

Skřinářov is a municipality and village in Žďár nad Sázavou District in the Vysočina Region of the Czech Republic. It has about 100 inhabitants.

Skřinářov lies approximately 29 kilometres (18 mi) south-east of Žďár nad Sázavou, 43 km (27 mi) east of Jihlava, and 150 km (93 mi) south-east of Prague.

== Demographics ==
Historical population
Year	Pop.	±%
1869	287	—
1880	287	+0.0%
1890	289	+0.7%
1900	315	+9.0%
1910	300	−4.8%
1921	273	−9.0%
1930	256	−6.2%
1950	265	+3.5%
1961	262	−1.1%
1970	234	−10.7%
1980	218	−6.8%
1991	194	−11.0%
2001	146	−24.7%
2011	136	−6.8%
2021	154	+13.2%
Source: Censuses
