= Krásněves =

- Municipality
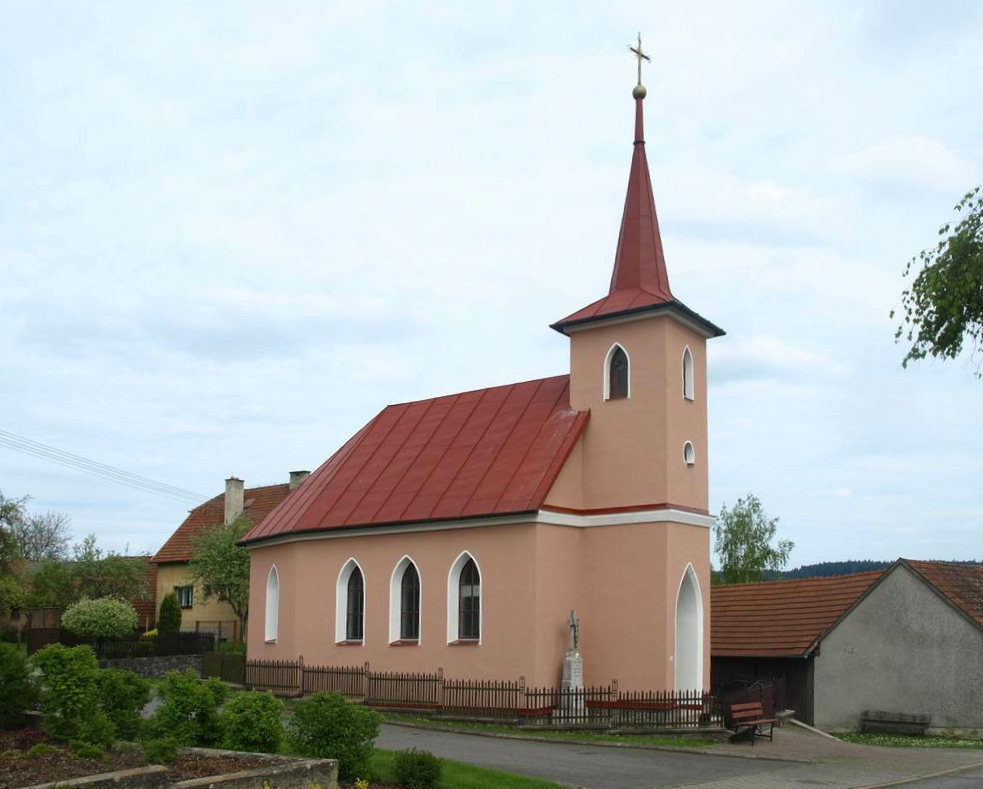
- Chapel of the Virgin Mary

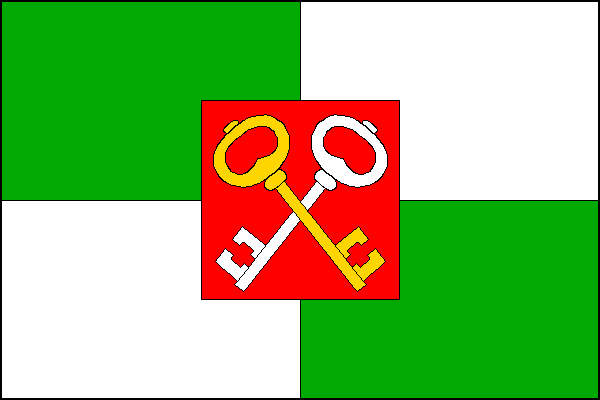
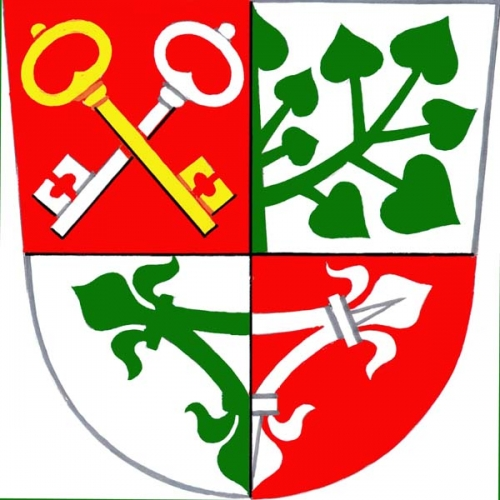
- Flag Coat of arms

- Location in the Czech Republic
- Coordinates: 49°26′40″N 15°58′52″E
- Country: Czech Republic
- Region: Vysočina
- District: Žďár nad Sázavou
- First mentioned: 1350

Area
  - Total: 4.14 km^{2} (1.60 sq mi)
- Elevation: 535 m (1,755 ft)

Population (2026-01-01)
  - Total: 281
  - Density: 67.9/km^{2} (176/sq mi)
- Time zone: UTC+1 (CET)
  - Summer (DST): UTC+2 (CEST)
- Postal code: 594 44
- Website: www.krasneves.eu

Krásněves is a municipality and village in Žďár nad Sázavou District in the Vysočina Region of the Czech Republic. It has about 300 inhabitants.

Krásněves lies approximately 14 kilometres (9 mi) south of Žďár nad Sázavou, 30 km (19 mi) east of Jihlava, and 134 km (83 mi) south-east of Prague.

== Demographics ==
Historical population
Year	Pop.	±%
1869	296	—
1880	339	+14.5%
1890	327	−3.5%
1900	346	+5.8%
1910	378	+9.2%
1921	377	−0.3%
1930	341	−9.5%
1950	288	−15.5%
1961	326	+13.2%
1970	327	+0.3%
1980	299	−8.6%
1991	275	−8.0%
2001	265	−3.6%
2011	262	−1.1%
2021	270	+3.1%
Source: Censuses
