= Vatín =

- Municipality
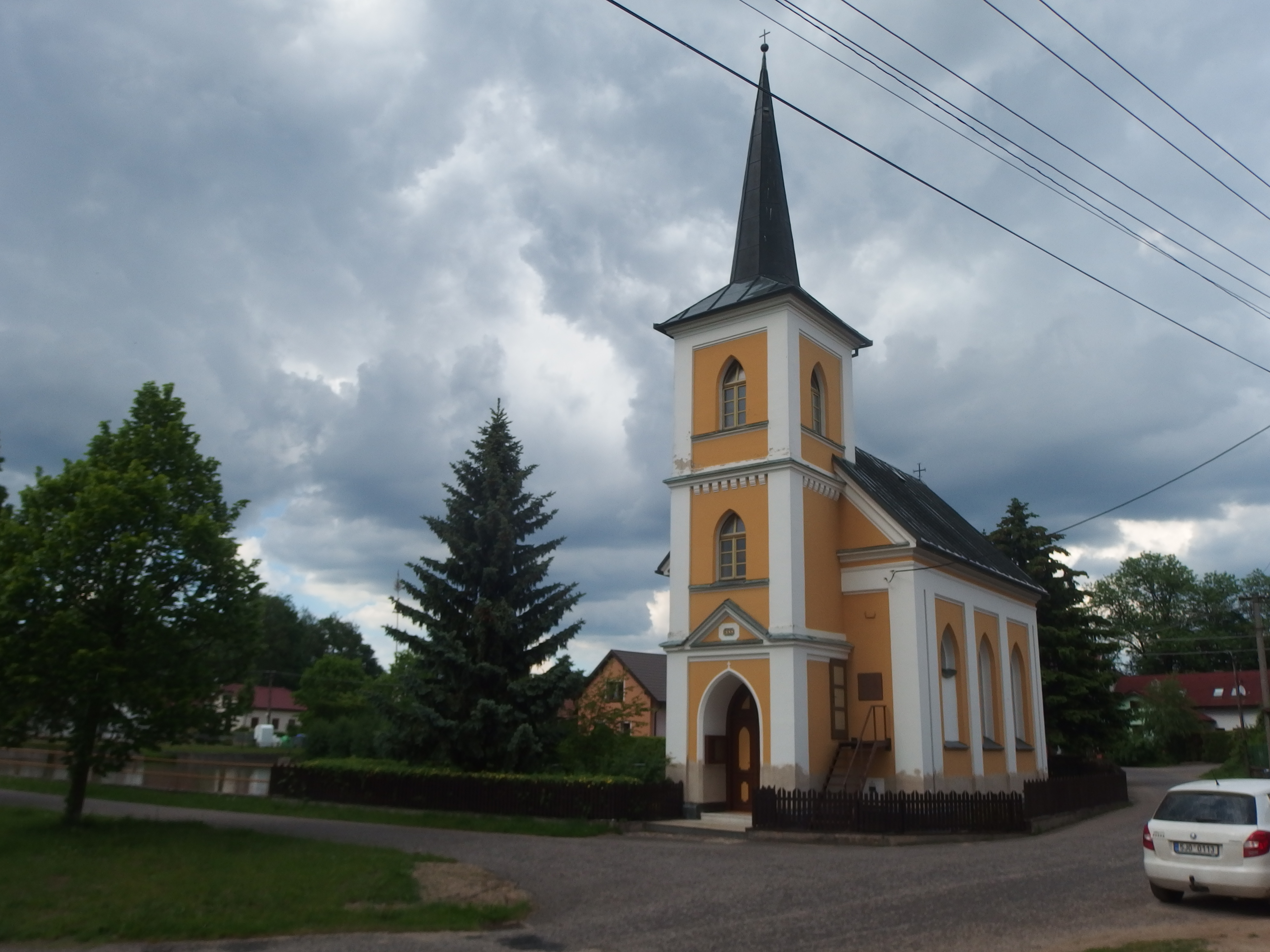
- Chapel of Our Lady of Sorrows

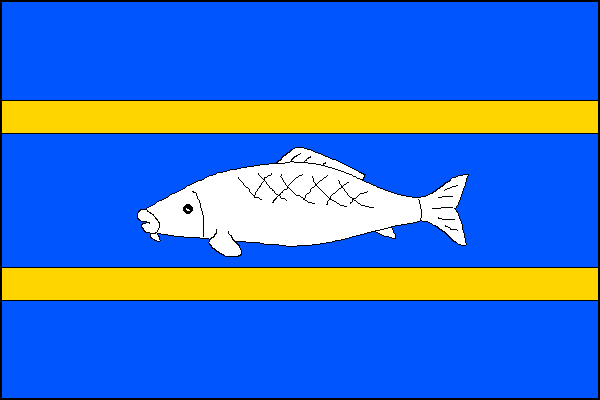
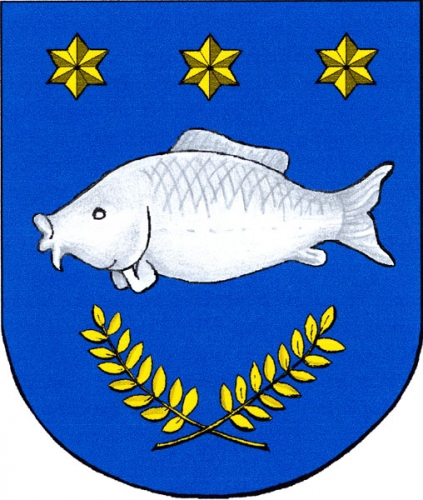
- Flag Coat of arms

- Location in the Czech Republic
- Coordinates: 49°31′30″N 15°58′2″E
- Country: Czech Republic
- Region: Vysočina
- District: Žďár nad Sázavou
- First mentioned: 1353

Area
  - Total: 4.86 km^{2} (1.88 sq mi)
- Elevation: 560 m (1,840 ft)

Population (2026-01-01)
  - Total: 292
  - Density: 60.1/km^{2} (156/sq mi)
- Time zone: UTC+1 (CET)
  - Summer (DST): UTC+2 (CEST)
- Postal code: 591 01
- Website: vatin.cz

Vatín is a municipality and village in Žďár nad Sázavou District in the Vysočina Region of the Czech Republic. It has about 300 inhabitants.

Vatín lies approximately 5 kilometres (3 mi) south-east of Žďár nad Sázavou, 31 km (19 mi) north-east of Jihlava, and 128 km (80 mi) south-east of Prague.

== Demographics ==
Historical population
Year	Pop.	±%
1869	331	—
1880	362	+9.4%
1890	358	−1.1%
1900	320	−10.6%
1910	320	+0.0%
1921	330	+3.1%
1930	311	−5.8%
1950	267	−14.1%
1961	273	+2.2%
1970	297	+8.8%
1980	281	−5.4%
1991	304	+8.2%
2001	324	+6.6%
2011	335	+3.4%
2021	317	−5.4%
Source: Censuses
