= Světnov =

- Municipality
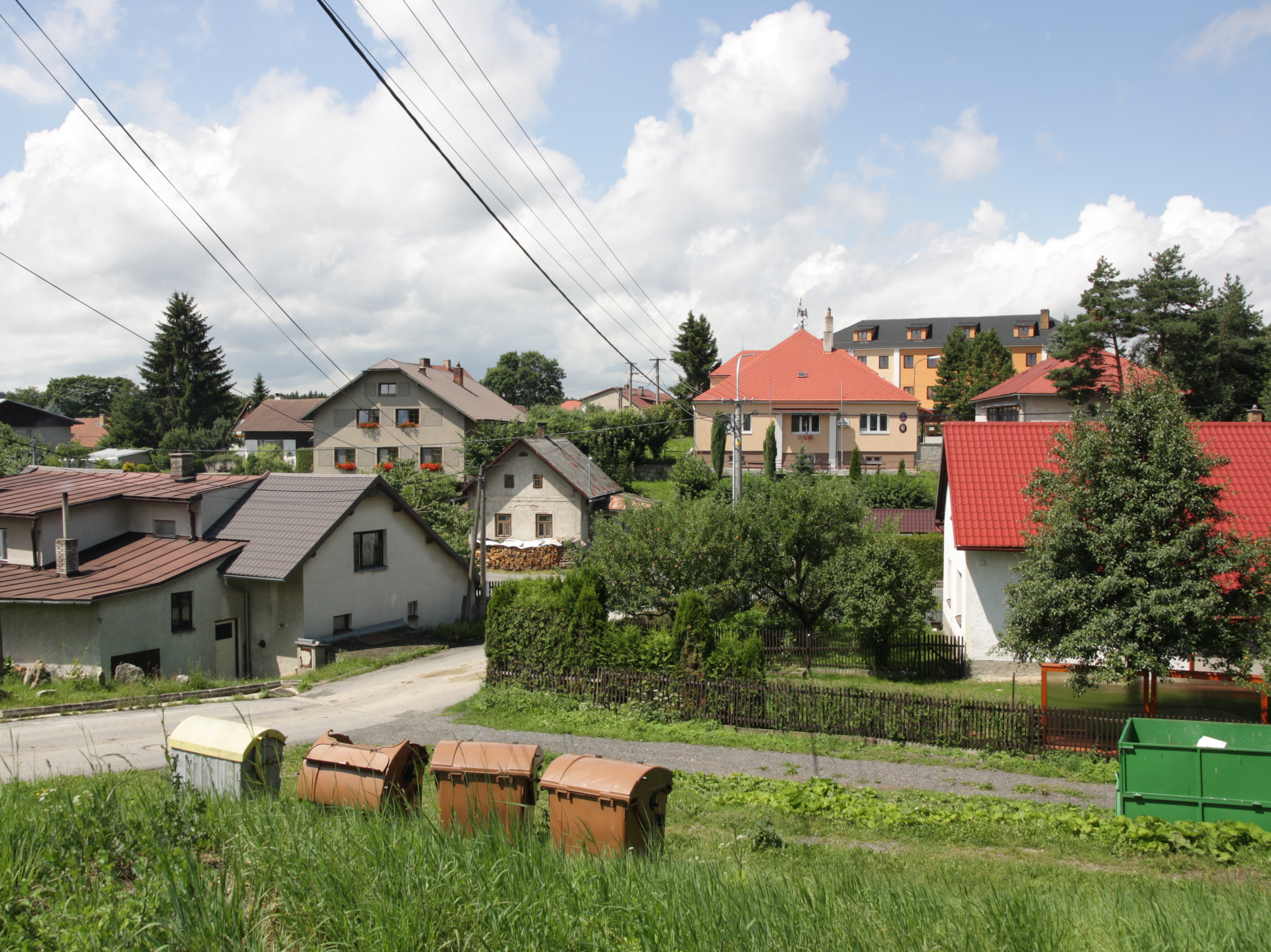
- Centre of Světnov

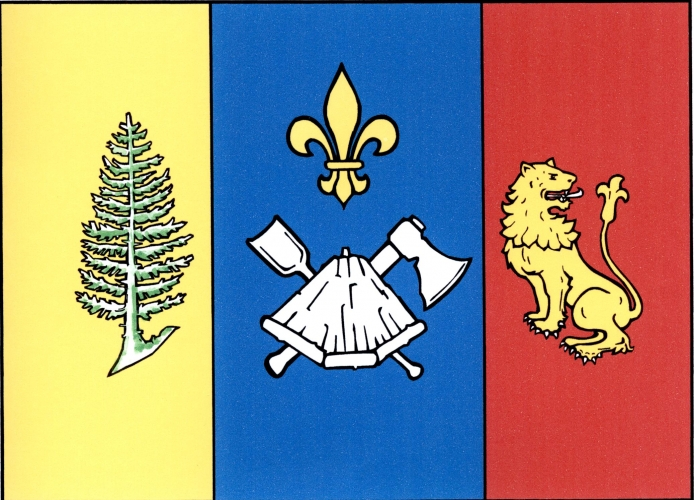
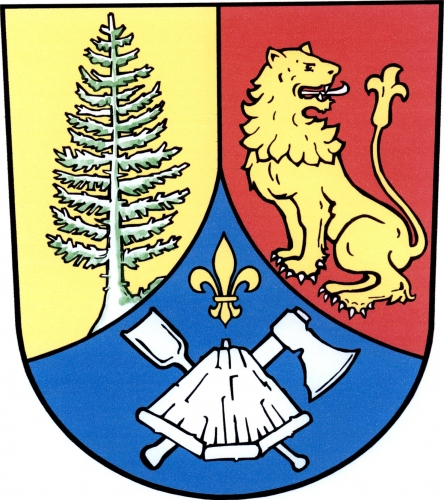
- Flag Coat of arms

- Location in the Czech Republic
- Coordinates: 49°37′14″N 15°57′19″E
- Country: Czech Republic
- Region: Vysočina
- District: Žďár nad Sázavou
- First mentioned: 1366

Area
  - Total: 11.00 km^{2} (4.25 sq mi)
- Elevation: 605 m (1,985 ft)

Population (2026-01-01)
  - Total: 437
  - Density: 39.7/km^{2} (103/sq mi)
- Time zone: UTC+1 (CET)
  - Summer (DST): UTC+2 (CEST)
- Postal code: 591 02
- Website: www.svetnov.cz

Světnov is a municipality and village in Žďár nad Sázavou District in the Vysočina Region of the Czech Republic. It has about 400 inhabitants.

Světnov lies approximately 7 kilometres (4 mi) north of Žďár nad Sázavou, 37 km (23 mi) north-east of Jihlava, and 123 km (76 mi) south-east of Prague.

== Demographics ==
Historical population
Year	Pop.	±%
1869	959	—
1880	861	−10.2%
1890	872	+1.3%
1900	778	−10.8%
1910	770	−1.0%
1921	771	+0.1%
1930	664	−13.9%
1950	572	−13.9%
1961	554	−3.1%
1970	485	−12.5%
1980	474	−2.3%
1991	419	−11.6%
2001	409	−2.4%
2011	437	+6.8%
2021	440	+0.7%
Source: Censuses
