= Křoví =

- Municipality
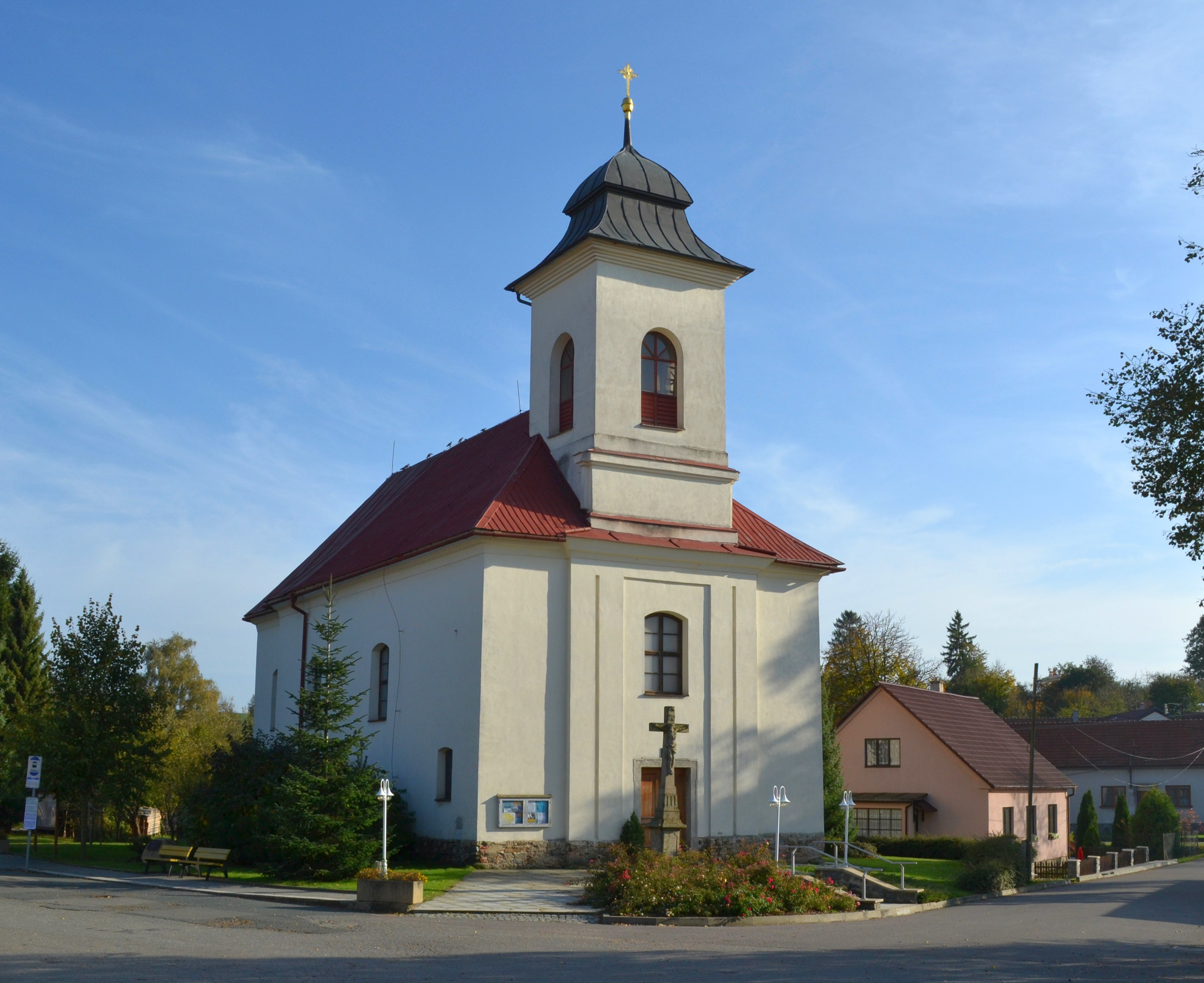
- Church of Saints Peter and Paul

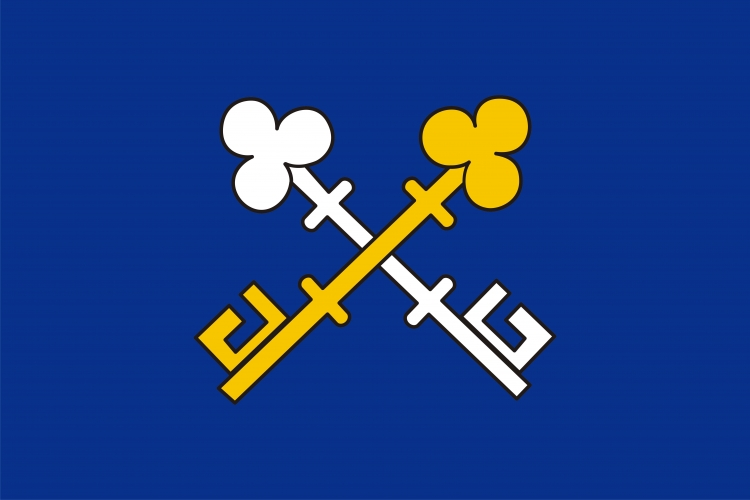
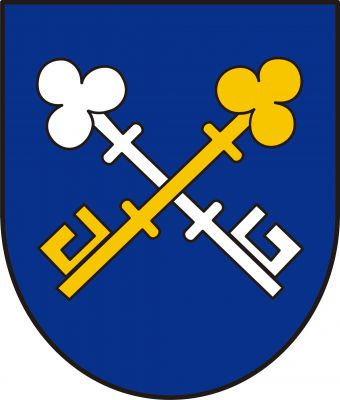
- Flag Coat of arms

- Location in the Czech Republic
- Coordinates: 49°18′22″N 16°15′51″E
- Country: Czech Republic
- Region: Vysočina
- District: Žďár nad Sázavou
- First mentioned: 1371

Area
  - Total: 7.04 km^{2} (2.72 sq mi)
- Elevation: 458 m (1,503 ft)

Population (2026-01-01)
  - Total: 641
  - Density: 91.1/km^{2} (236/sq mi)
- Time zone: UTC+1 (CET)
  - Summer (DST): UTC+2 (CEST)
- Postal code: 594 54
- Website: www.obec-krovi.cz

Křoví is a municipality and village in Žďár nad Sázavou District in the Vysočina Region of the Czech Republic. It has about 600 inhabitants.

Křoví lies approximately 37 kilometres (23 mi) south-east of Žďár nad Sázavou, 50 kilometres (31 mi) east of Jihlava, 158 kilometres (98 mi) south-east of Prague, and 35 kilometres (22 mi) north-west of Brno.

== Demographics ==
Historical population
Year	Pop.	±%
1869	500	—
1880	584	+16.8%
1890	543	−7.0%
1900	543	+0.0%
1910	516	−5.0%
1921	516	+0.0%
1930	503	−2.5%
1950	500	−0.6%
1961	551	+10.2%
1970	555	+0.7%
1980	549	−1.1%
1991	536	−2.4%
2001	523	−2.4%
2011	565	+8.0%
2021	615	+8.8%
Source: Censuses
