= Chlumětín =

- Municipality
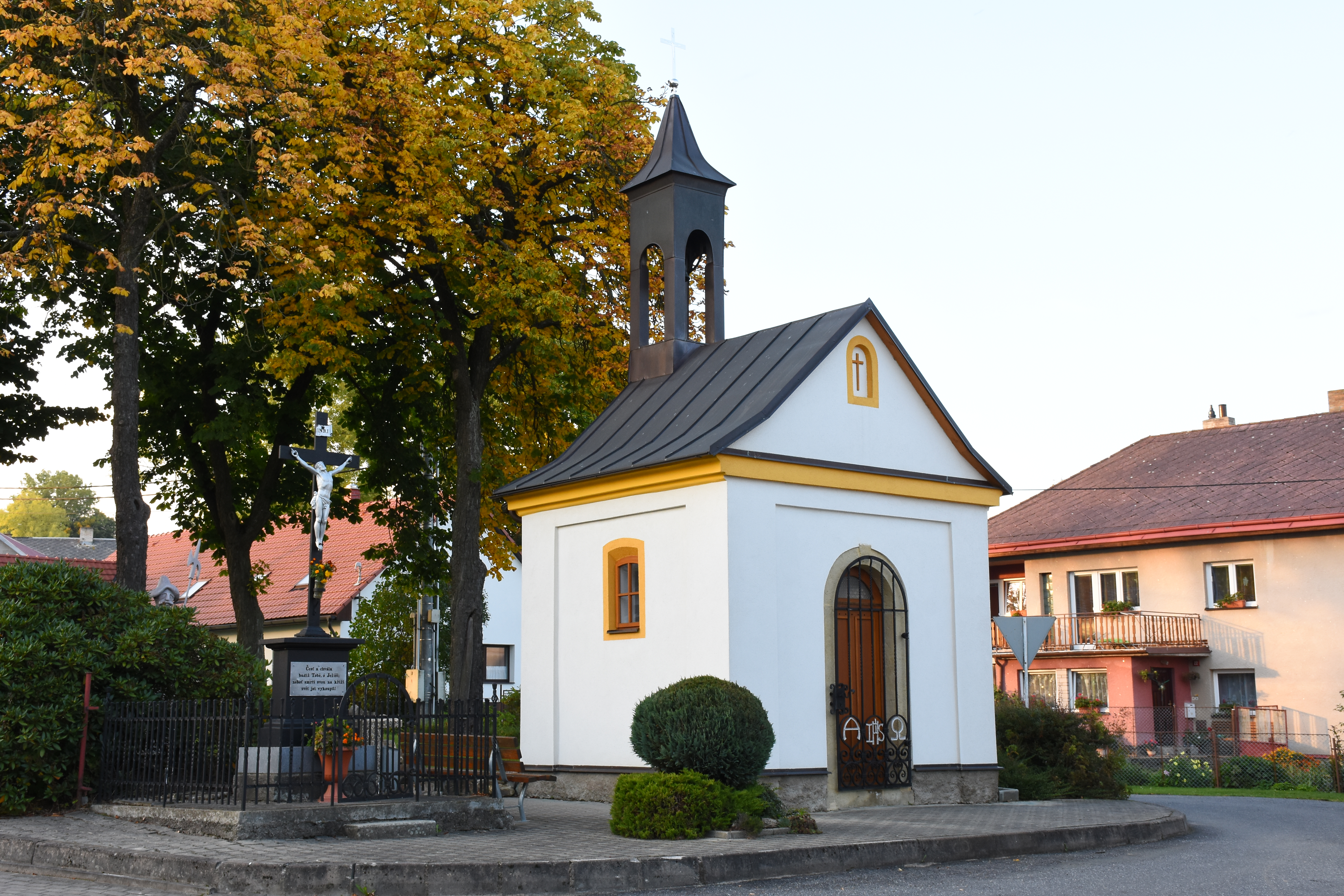
- Chapel of the Virgin Mary

- Flag Coat of arms

- Location in the Czech Republic
- Coordinates: 49°43′39″N 16°0′11″E
- Country: Czech Republic
- Region: Vysočina
- District: Žďár nad Sázavou
- First mentioned: 1392

Area
  - Total: 6.64 km^{2} (2.56 sq mi)
- Elevation: 667 m (2,188 ft)

Population (2026-01-01)
  - Total: 229
  - Density: 34.5/km^{2} (89.3/sq mi)
- Time zone: UTC+1 (CET)
  - Summer (DST): UTC+2 (CEST)
- Postal code: 592 02
- Website: www.chlumetin.cz

Chlumětín is a municipality and village in Žďár nad Sázavou District in the Vysočina Region of the Czech Republic. It has about 200 inhabitants.

Chlumětín lies approximately 18 kilometres (11 mi) north of Žďár nad Sázavou, 46 km (29 mi) north-east of Jihlava, and 120 km (75 mi) east of Prague.

== Demographics ==
Historical population
Year	Pop.	±%
1869	525	—
1880	539	+2.7%
1890	518	−3.9%
1900	522	+0.8%
1910	515	−1.3%
1921	474	−8.0%
1930	466	−1.7%
1950	333	−28.5%
1961	353	+6.0%
1970	313	−11.3%
1980	269	−14.1%
1991	223	−17.1%
2001	211	−5.4%
2011	178	−15.6%
2021	210	+18.0%
Source: Censuses
