= Dolní Libochová =

- Municipality
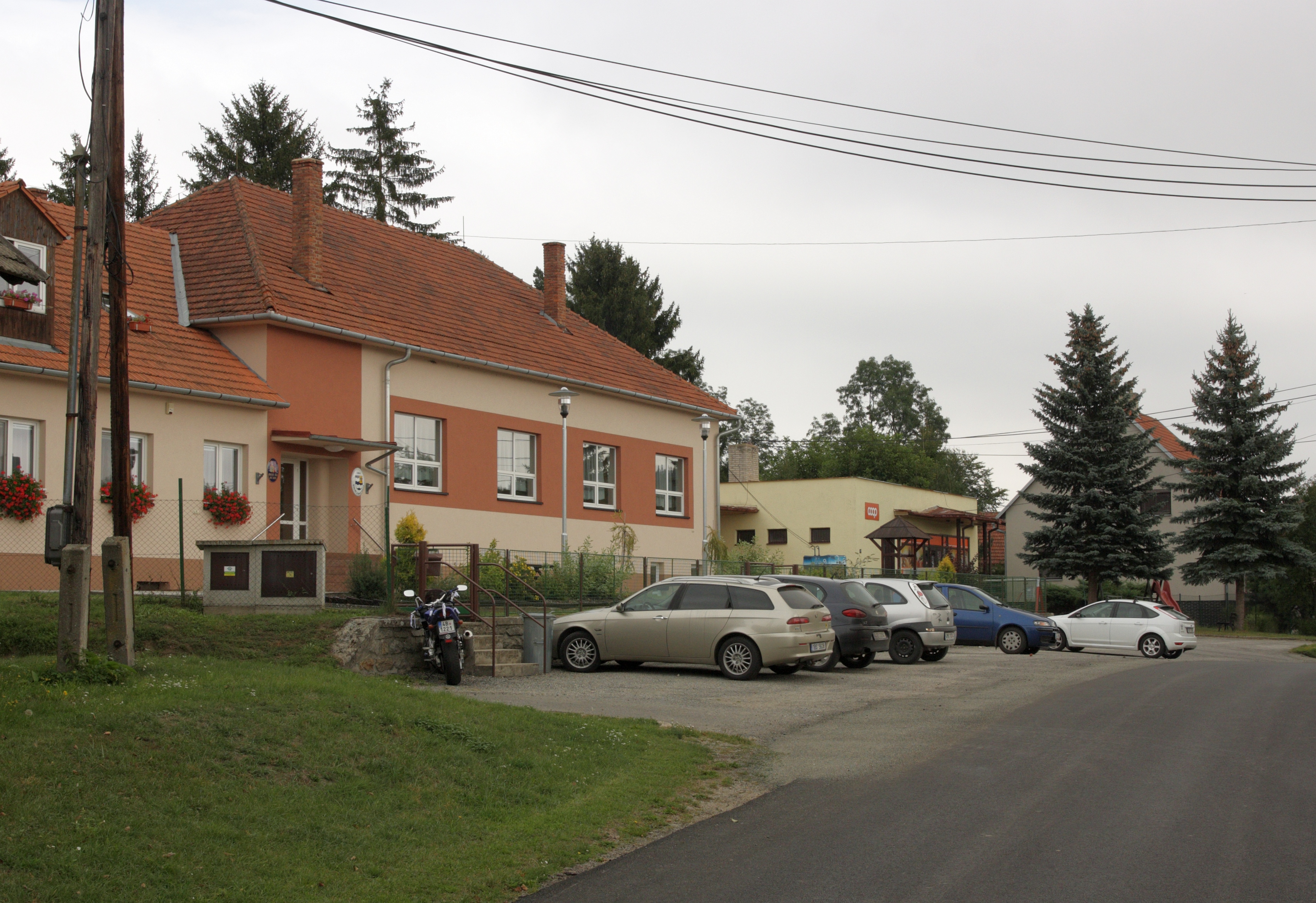
- Municipal office

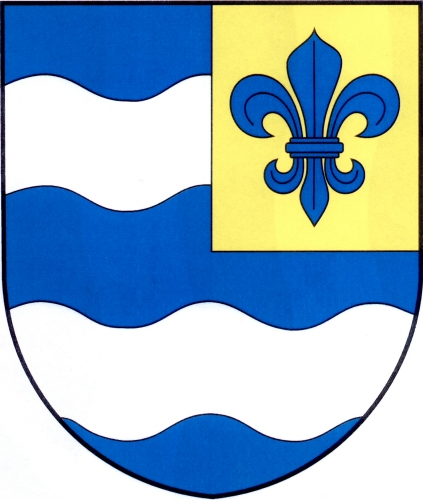
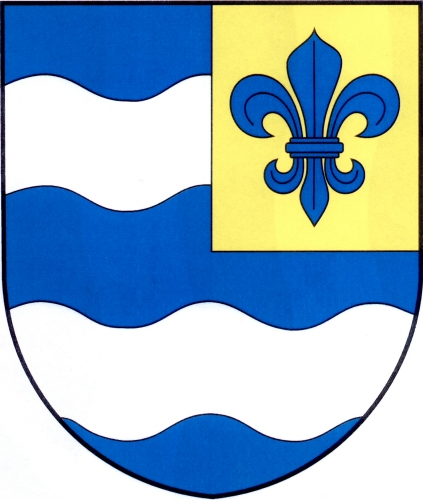
- Flag Coat of arms

- Location in the Czech Republic
- Coordinates: 49°24′30″N 16°11′5″E
- Country: Czech Republic
- Region: Vysočina
- District: Žďár nad Sázavou
- First mentioned: 1350

Area
  - Total: 4.10 km^{2} (1.58 sq mi)
- Elevation: 483 m (1,585 ft)

Population (2026-01-01)
  - Total: 137
  - Density: 33.4/km^{2} (86.5/sq mi)
- Time zone: UTC+1 (CET)
  - Summer (DST): UTC+2 (CEST)
- Postal code: 592 53
- Website: www.dolnilibochova.cz

Dolní Libochová is a municipality and village in Žďár nad Sázavou District in the Vysočina Region of the Czech Republic. It has about 100 inhabitants.

Dolní Libochová lies approximately 25 kilometres (16 mi) south-east of Žďár nad Sázavou, 44 km (27 mi) east of Jihlava, and 148 km (92 mi) south-east of Prague.

== Demographics ==
Historical population
| Year | Pop. | ±% |
|---|---|---|
| 1869 | 423 | — |
| 1880 | 482 | +13.9% |
| 1890 | 426 | −11.6% |
| 1900 | 376 | −11.7% |
| 1910 | 336 | −10.6% |
| 1921 | 333 | −0.9% |
| 1930 | 296 | −11.1% |
| 1950 | 223 | −24.7% |
| 1961 | 212 | −4.9% |
| 1970 | 188 | −11.3% |
| 1980 | 175 | −6.9% |
| 1991 | 158 | −9.7% |
| 2001 | 156 | −1.3% |
| 2011 | 162 | +3.8% |
| 2021 | 141 | −13.0% |
Source: Censuses
