= Nyklovice =

- Municipality
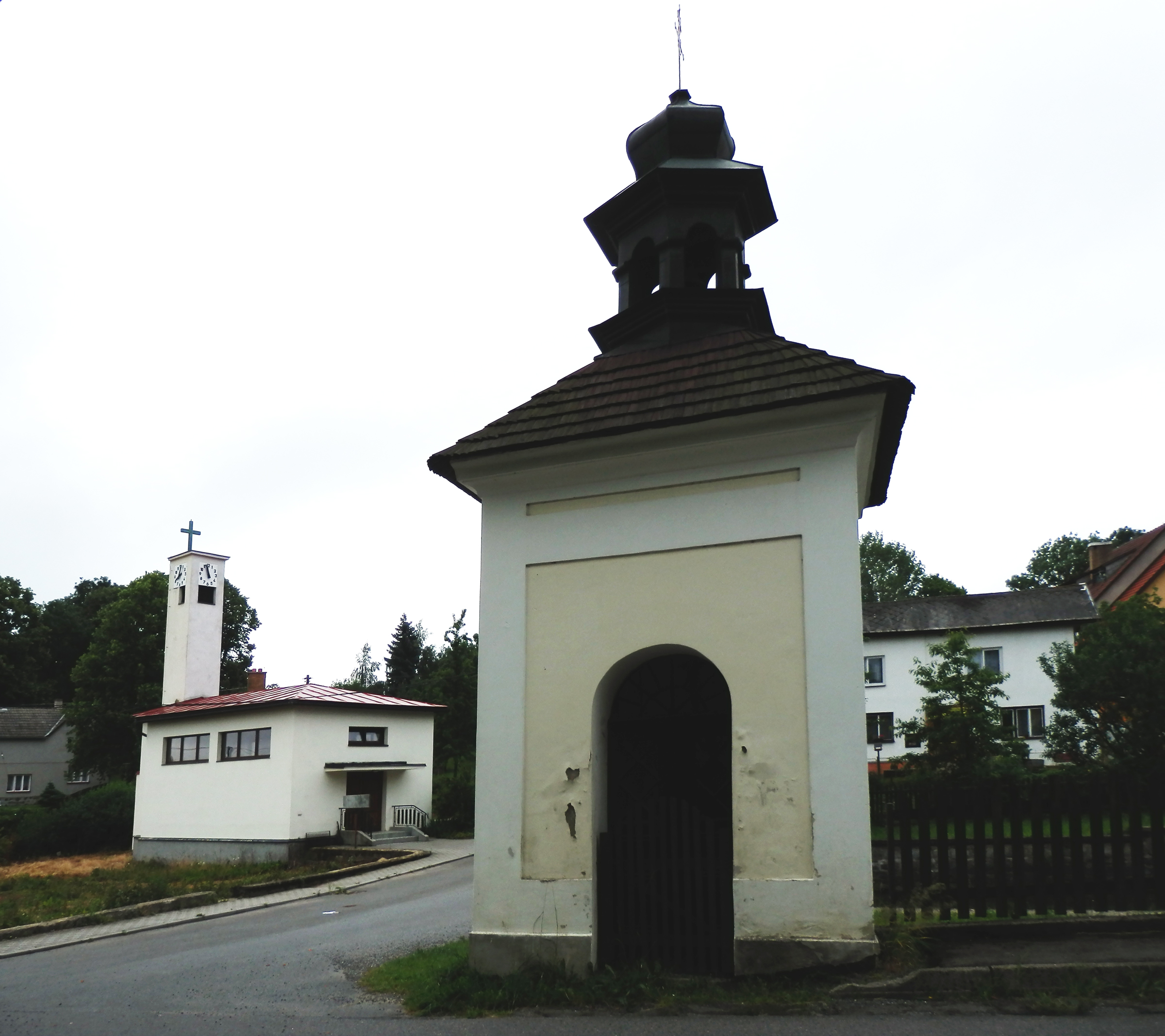
- Chapel of Saint John of Nepomuk

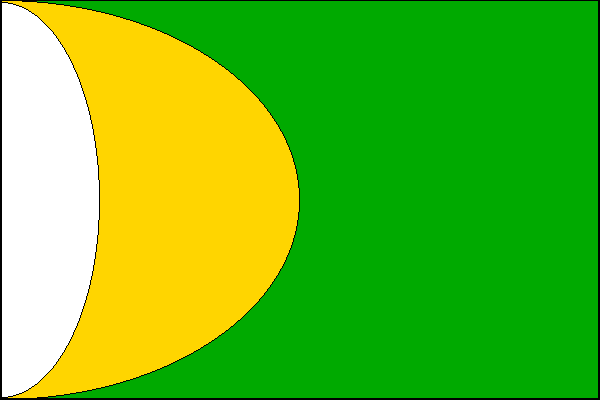
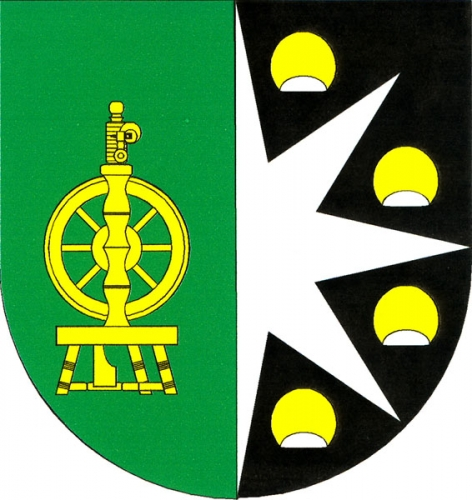
- Flag Coat of arms

- Location in the Czech Republic
- Coordinates: 49°36′14″N 16°20′42″E
- Country: Czech Republic
- Region: Vysočina
- District: Žďár nad Sázavou
- First mentioned: 1335

Area
  - Total: 3.32 km^{2} (1.28 sq mi)
- Elevation: 672 m (2,205 ft)

Population (2026-01-01)
  - Total: 177
  - Density: 53.3/km^{2} (138/sq mi)
- Time zone: UTC+1 (CET)
  - Summer (DST): UTC+2 (CEST)
- Postal code: 592 65
- Website: www.obecnyklovice.cz

Nyklovice (German: Niklowitz) is a municipality and village in Žďár nad Sázavou District in the Vysočina Region of the Czech Republic. It has about 200 inhabitants.

Nyklovice lies approximately 29 kilometres (18 mi) east of Žďár nad Sázavou, 59 km (37 mi) north-east of Jihlava, and 148 km (92 mi) east of Prague.

== Demographics ==
Historical population
Year	Pop.	±%
1869	333	—
1880	287	−13.8%
1890	309	+7.7%
1900	299	−3.2%
1910	285	−4.7%
1921	271	−4.9%
1930	249	−8.1%
1950	242	−2.8%
1961	262	+8.3%
1970	241	−8.0%
1980	199	−17.4%
1991	187	−6.0%
2001	165	−11.8%
2011	160	−3.0%
2021	169	+5.6%
Source: Censuses
