= Milešín =

- Municipality
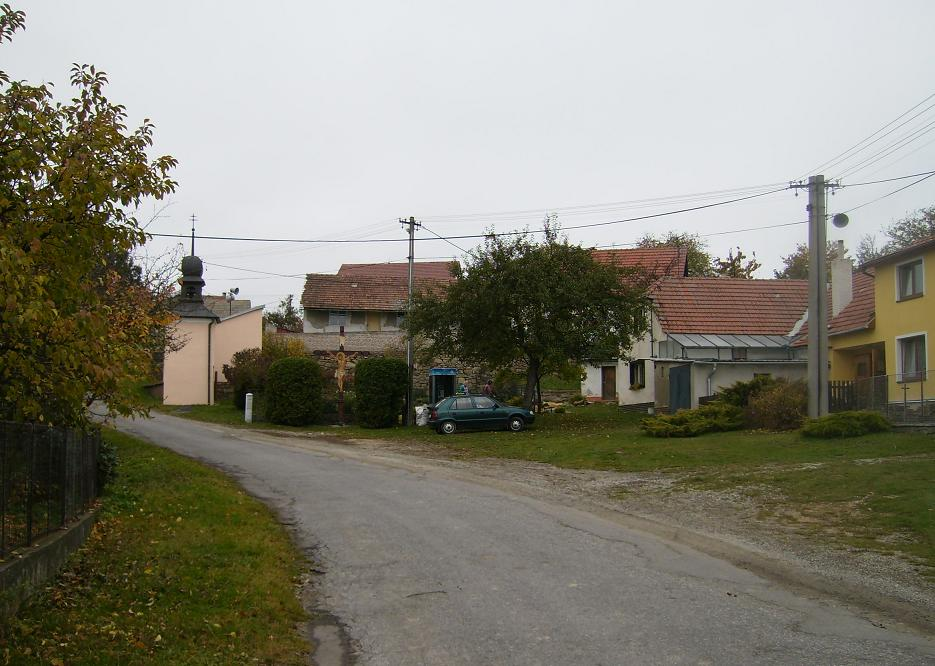
- Centre of Milešín

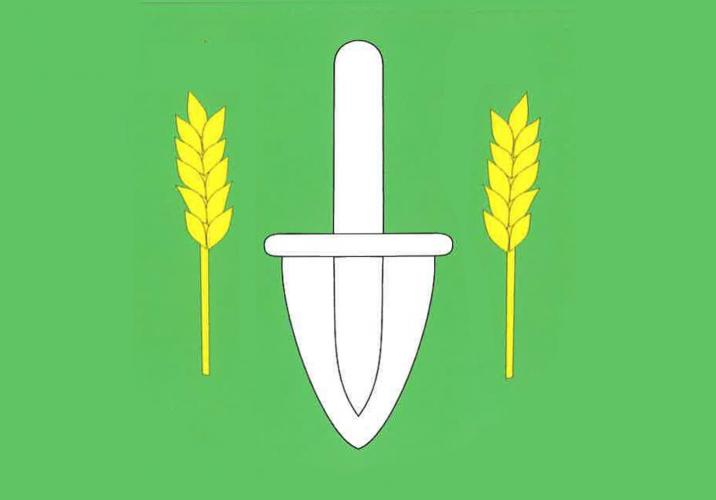
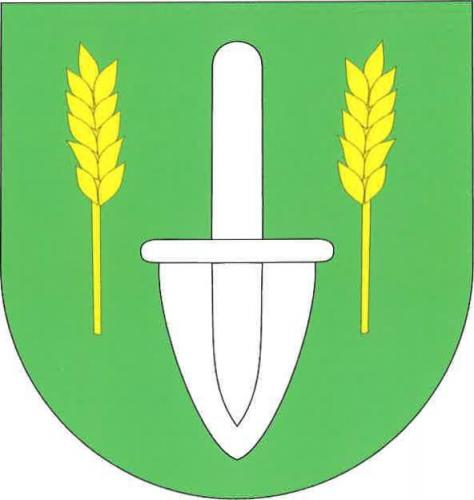
- Flag Coat of arms

- Location in the Czech Republic
- Coordinates: 49°22′6″N 16°12′6″E
- Country: Czech Republic
- Region: Vysočina
- District: Žďár nad Sázavou
- First mentioned: 1364

Area
  - Total: 2.92 km^{2} (1.13 sq mi)
- Elevation: 537 m (1,762 ft)

Population (2026-01-01)
  - Total: 92
  - Density: 32/km^{2} (82/sq mi)
- Time zone: UTC+1 (CET)
  - Summer (DST): UTC+2 (CEST)
- Postal code: 594 51
- Website: www.milesin.cz

Milešín is a municipality and village in Žďár nad Sázavou District in the Vysočina Region of the Czech Republic. It has about 90 inhabitants.

Milešín lies approximately 30 kilometres (19 mi) south-east of Žďár nad Sázavou, 45 km (28 mi) east of Jihlava, and 152 km (94 mi) south-east of Prague.

== Demographics ==
Historical population
| Year | Pop. | ±% |
|---|---|---|
| 1869 | 208 | — |
| 1880 | 245 | +17.8% |
| 1890 | 212 | −13.5% |
| 1900 | 180 | −15.1% |
| 1910 | 169 | −6.1% |
| 1921 | 203 | +20.1% |
| 1930 | 186 | −8.4% |
| 1950 | 132 | −29.0% |
| 1961 | 144 | +9.1% |
| 1970 | 132 | −8.3% |
| 1980 | 96 | −27.3% |
| 1991 | 81 | −15.6% |
| 2001 | 76 | −6.2% |
| 2011 | 81 | +6.6% |
| 2021 | 72 | −11.1% |
Source: Censuses
