= Rousměrov =

- Municipality
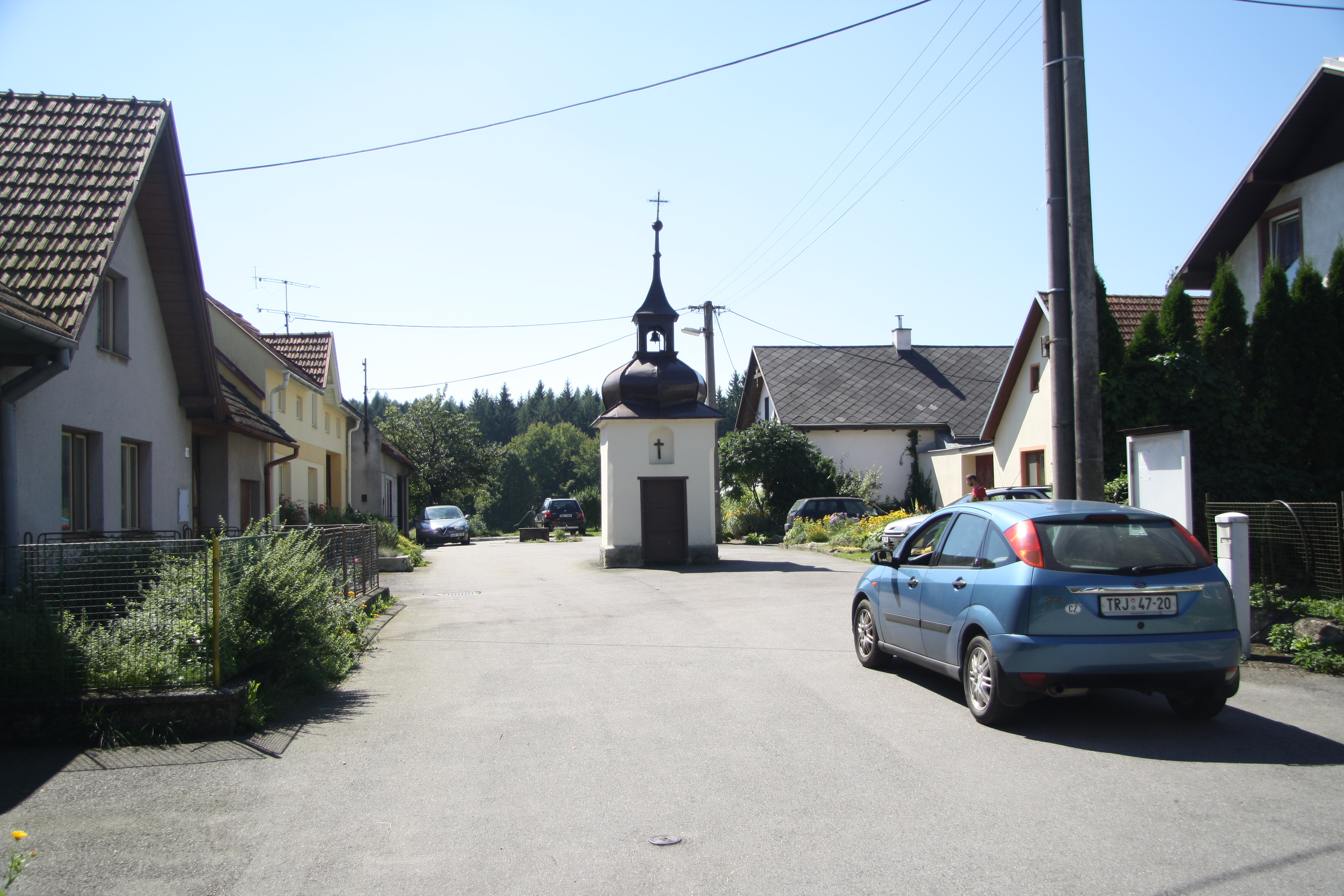
- Laštovičky, a part of Rousměrov

- Flag Coat of arms

- Location in the Czech Republic
- Coordinates: 49°27′28″N 16°1′57″E
- Country: Czech Republic
- Region: Vysočina
- District: Žďár nad Sázavou
- First mentioned: 1407

Area
  - Total: 5.44 km^{2} (2.10 sq mi)
- Elevation: 580 m (1,900 ft)

Population (2026-01-01)
  - Total: 108
  - Density: 19.9/km^{2} (51.4/sq mi)
- Time zone: UTC+1 (CET)
  - Summer (DST): UTC+2 (CEST)
- Postal code: 591 01
- Website: www.obecrousmerov.cz

Rousměrov is a municipality and village in Žďár nad Sázavou District in the Vysočina Region of the Czech Republic. It has about 100 inhabitants.

Rousměrov lies approximately 14 kilometres (9 mi) south-east of Žďár nad Sázavou, 33 km (21 mi) east of Jihlava, and 136 km (85 mi) south-east of Prague.

== Administrative division ==
Rousměrov consists of two municipal parts (in brackets population according to the 2021 census):

- Rousměrov (77)
- Laštovičky (31)

== Demographics ==
Historical population
Year	Pop.	±%
1869	238	—
1880	235	−1.3%
1890	207	−11.9%
1900	219	+5.8%
1910	199	−9.1%
1921	174	−12.6%
1930	179	+2.9%
1950	157	−12.3%
1961	175	+11.5%
1970	165	−5.7%
1980	161	−2.4%
1991	146	−9.3%
2001	114	−21.9%
2011	111	−2.6%
2021	108	−2.7%
Source: Censuses
