= Rodkov =

- Municipality
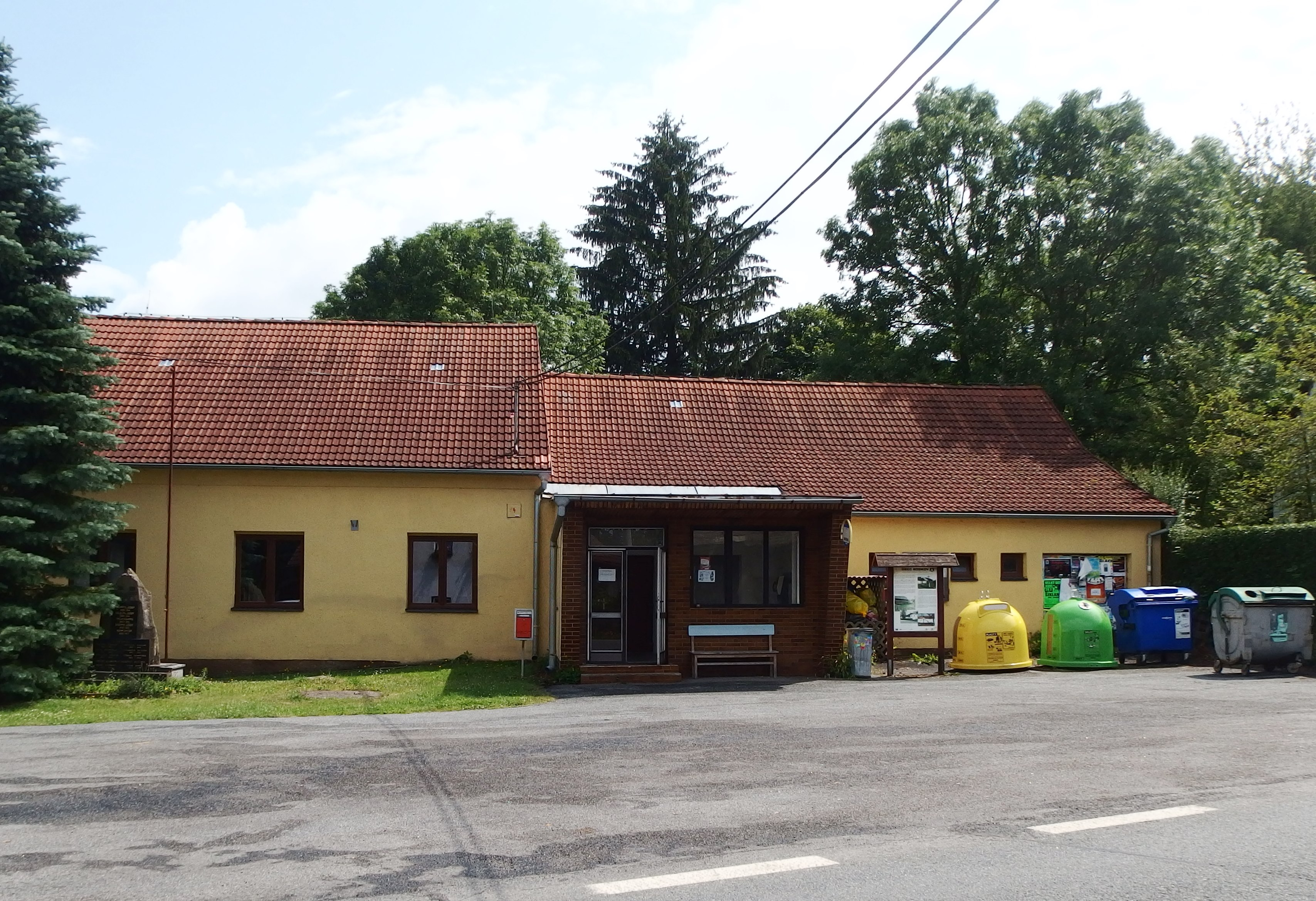
- Municipal office

- Flag Coat of arms

- Location in the Czech Republic
- Coordinates: 49°30′14″N 16°13′39″E
- Country: Czech Republic
- Region: Vysočina
- District: Žďár nad Sázavou
- First mentioned: 1436

Area
  - Total: 3.22 km^{2} (1.24 sq mi)
- Elevation: 520 m (1,710 ft)

Population (2026-01-01)
  - Total: 106
  - Density: 32.9/km^{2} (85.3/sq mi)
- Time zone: UTC+1 (CET)
  - Summer (DST): UTC+2 (CEST)
- Postal code: 592 51

Rodkov is a municipality and village in Žďár nad Sázavou District in the Vysočina Region of the Czech Republic. It has about 100 inhabitants.

Rodkov lies approximately 22 kilometres (14 mi) east of Žďár nad Sázavou, 48 km (30 mi) east of Jihlava, and 145 km (90 mi) south-east of Prague.

== Demographics ==
Historical population
Year	Pop.	±%
1869	319	—
1880	275	−13.8%
1890	276	+0.4%
1900	244	−11.6%
1910	268	+9.8%
1921	267	−0.4%
1930	221	−17.2%
1950	185	−16.3%
1961	190	+2.7%
1970	168	−11.6%
1980	131	−22.0%
1991	97	−26.0%
2001	93	−4.1%
2011	102	+9.7%
2021	99	−2.9%
Source: Censuses
