= Věcov =

- Municipality
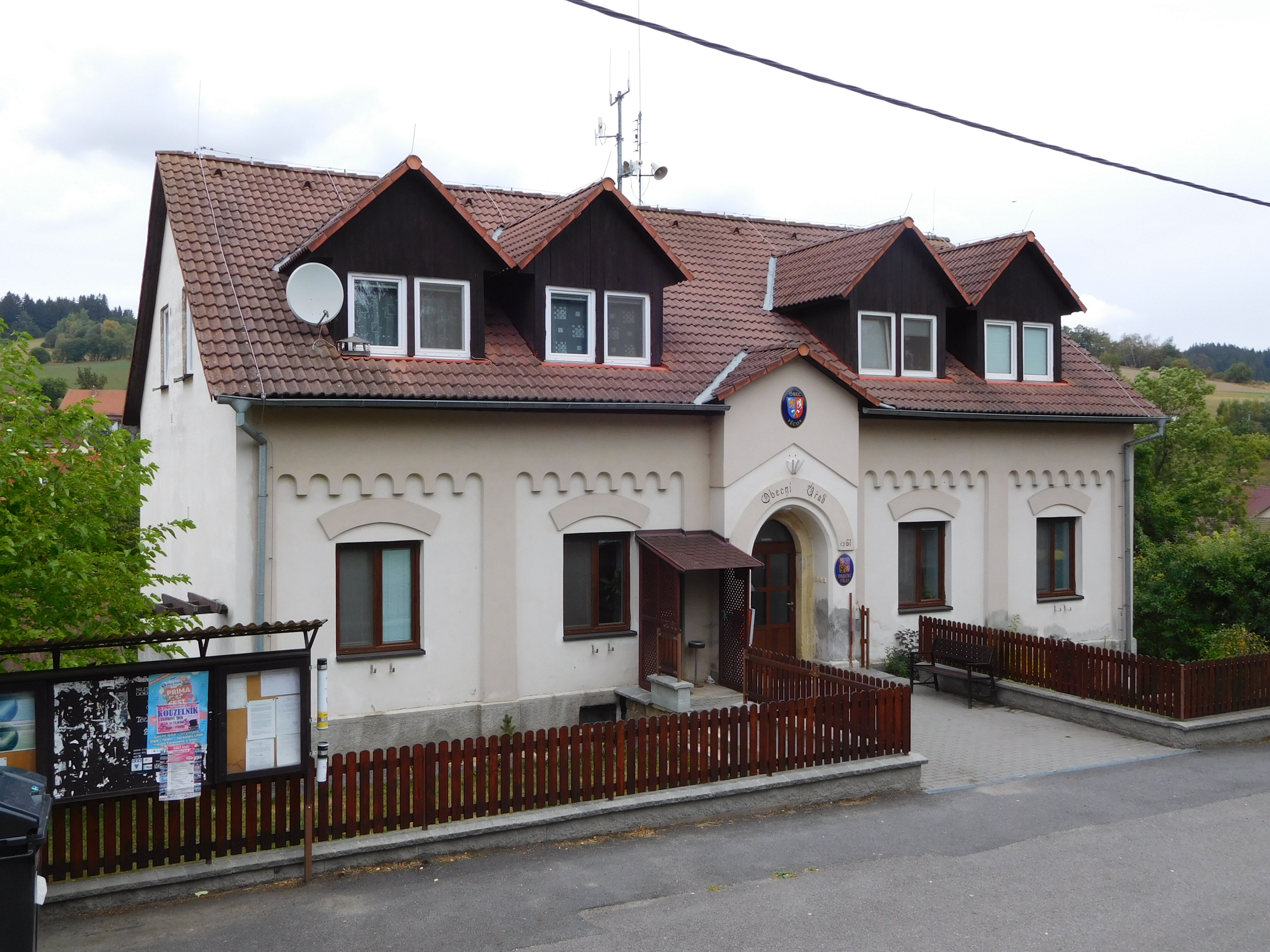
- Municipal office

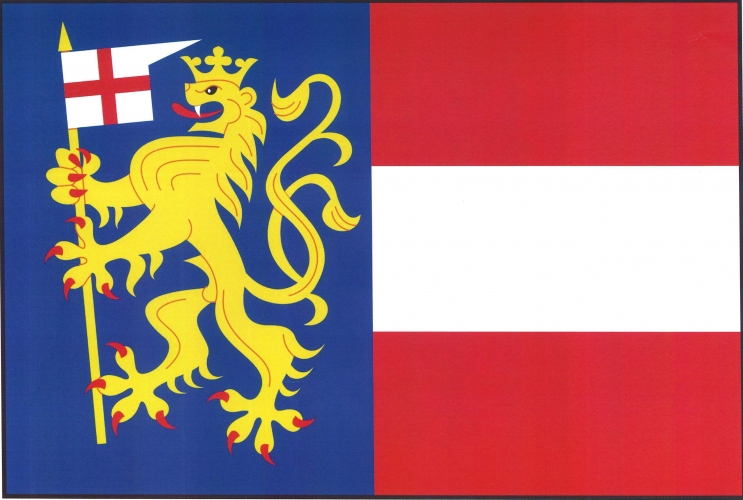
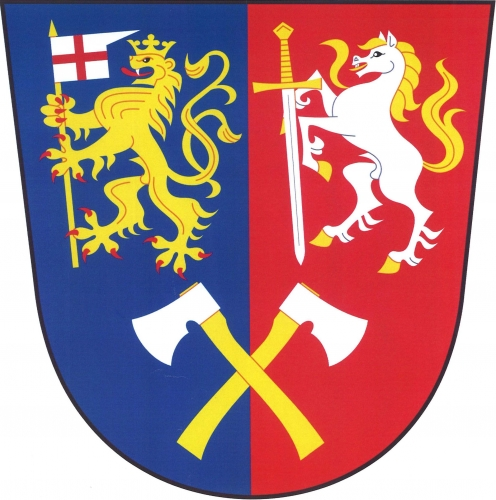
- Flag Coat of arms

- Location in the Czech Republic
- Coordinates: 49°36′58″N 16°10′12″E
- Country: Czech Republic
- Region: Vysočina
- District: Žďár nad Sázavou
- First mentioned: 1392

Area
  - Total: 18.53 km^{2} (7.15 sq mi)
- Elevation: 595 m (1,952 ft)

Population (2026-01-01)
  - Total: 708
  - Density: 38.2/km^{2} (99.0/sq mi)
- Time zone: UTC+1 (CET)
  - Summer (DST): UTC+2 (CEST)
- Postal code: 592 42, 592 44
- Website: www.vecov.cz

Věcov (German: Wietzau) is a municipality and village in Žďár nad Sázavou District in the Vysočina Region of the Czech Republic. It has about 700 inhabitants.

Věcov lies approximately 18 kilometres (11 mi) east of Žďár nad Sázavou, 49 kilometres (30 mi) north-east of Jihlava, and 136 kilometres (85 mi) south-east of Prague.

== Administrative division ==
Věcov consists of six municipal parts (in brackets population according to the 2021 census):

- Věcov (218)
- Jimramovské Pavlovice (91)
- Koníkov (32)
- Míchov (92)
- Odranec (104)
- Roženecké Paseky (133)

== Demographics ==
Historical population
Year	Pop.	±%
1869	1,725	—
1880	1,640	−4.9%
1890	1,629	−0.7%
1900	1,573	−3.4%
1910	1,550	−1.5%
1921	1,475	−4.8%
1930	1,353	−8.3%
1950	934	−31.0%
1961	877	−6.1%
1970	777	−11.4%
1980	694	−10.7%
1991	691	−0.4%
2001	679	−1.7%
2011	691	+1.8%
2021	670	−3.0%
Source: Censuses
