= Prosetín (Žďár nad Sázavou District) =

Municipality and village in the Czech Republic

- Municipality
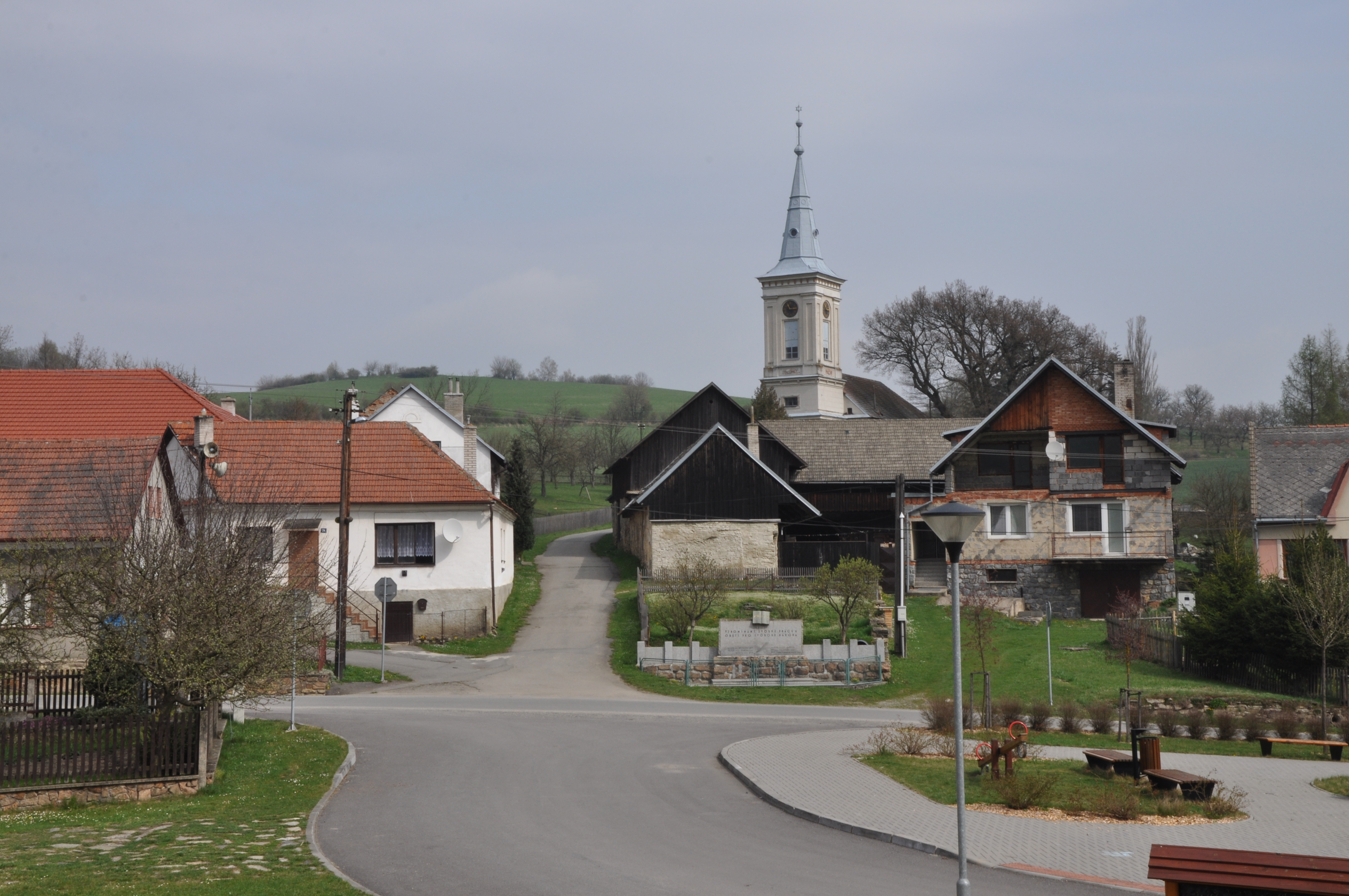
- View towards the Evangelical church

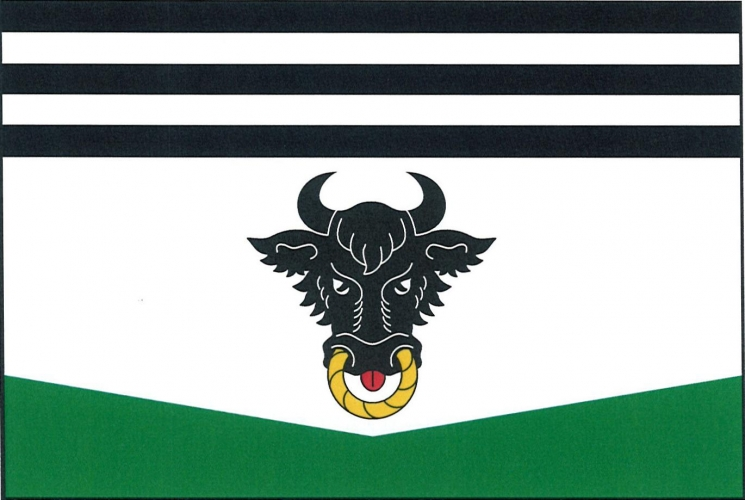
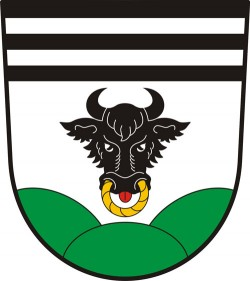
- Flag Coat of arms

- Location in the Czech Republic
- Coordinates: 49°31′35″N 16°23′42″E
- Country: Czech Republic
- Region: Vysočina
- District: Žďár nad Sázavou
- First mentioned: 1349

Area
  - Total: 15.75 km^{2} (6.08 sq mi)
- Elevation: 561 m (1,841 ft)

Population (2026-01-01)
  - Total: 358
  - Density: 22.7/km^{2} (58.9/sq mi)
- Time zone: UTC+1 (CET)
  - Summer (DST): UTC+2 (CEST)
- Postal codes: 592 64, 593 01
- Website: www.prosetin.cz

Prosetín is a municipality and village in Žďár nad Sázavou District in the Vysočina Region of the Czech Republic. It has about 400 inhabitants.

Prosetín lies approximately 34 kilometres (21 mi) east of Žďár nad Sázavou, 60 km (37 mi) east of Jihlava, and 156 km (97 mi) south-east of Prague.

== Administrative division ==
Prosetín consists of three municipal parts (in brackets population according to the 2021 census):

- Prosetín (192)
- Brťoví (55)
- Čtyři Dvory (102)

== Demographics ==
Historical population
Year	Pop.	±%
1869	701	—
1880	799	+14.0%
1890	763	−4.5%
1900	789	+3.4%
1910	827	+4.8%
1921	752	−9.1%
1930	703	−6.5%
1950	529	−24.8%
1961	519	−1.9%
1970	449	−13.5%
1980	426	−5.1%
1991	413	−3.1%
2001	428	+3.6%
2011	394	−7.9%
2021	349	−11.4%
Source: Censuses
