= Horní Libochová =

- Municipality
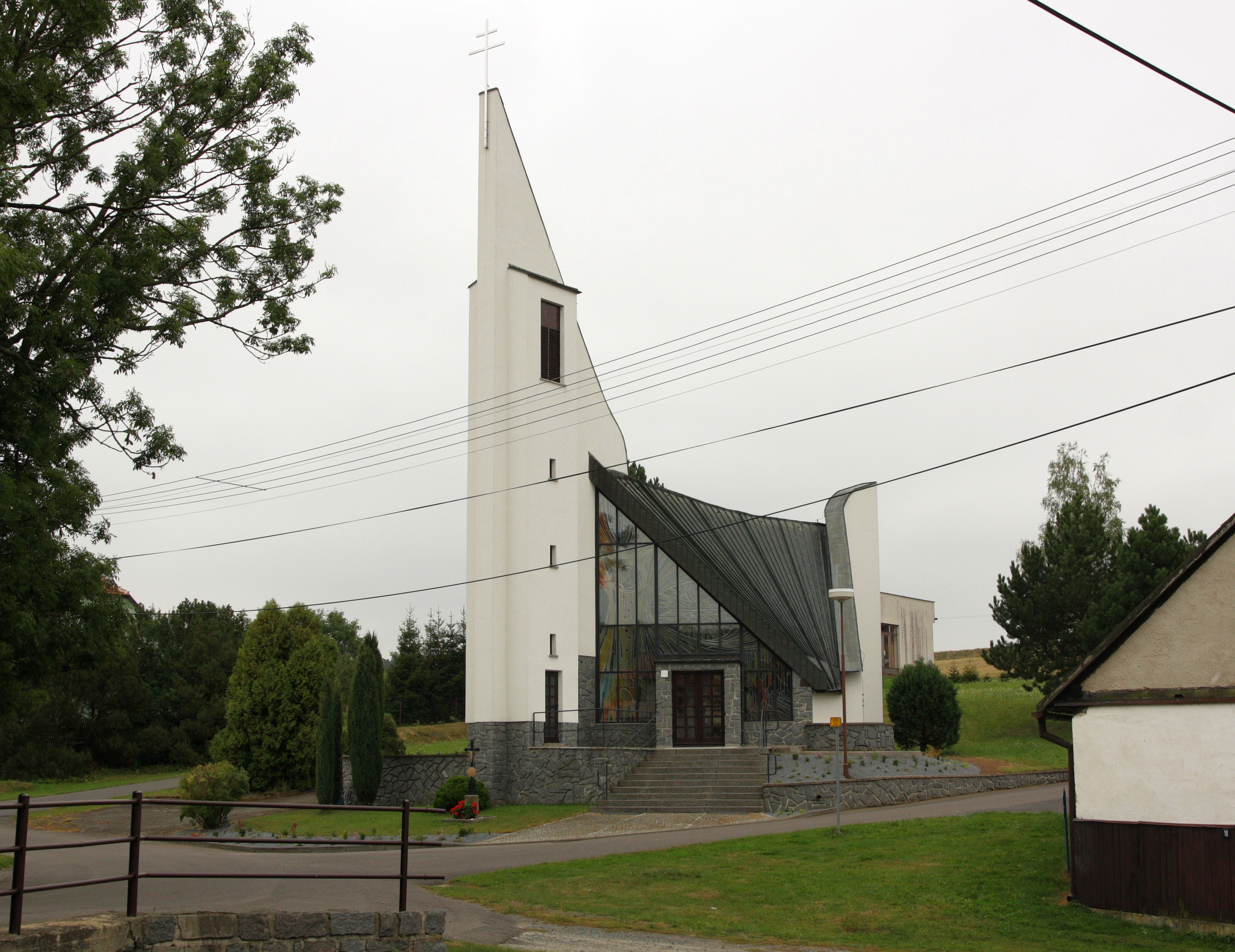
- Chapel of Saint Ludmila

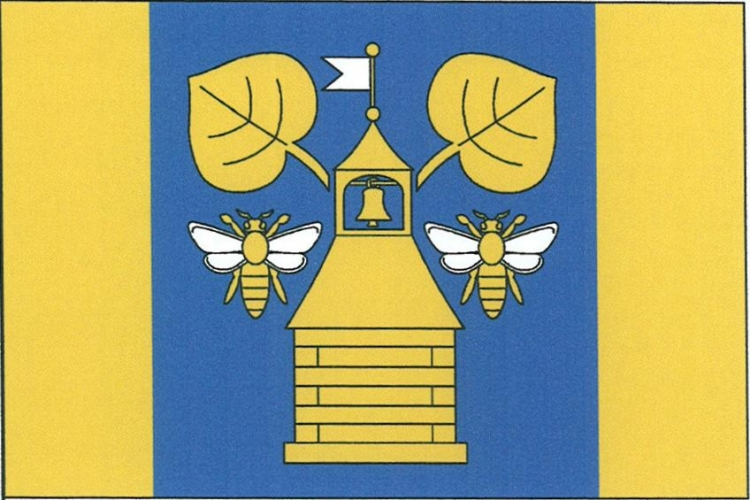
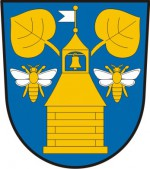
- Flag Coat of arms

- Location in the Czech Republic
- Coordinates: 49°24′28″N 16°8′56″E
- Country: Czech Republic
- Region: Vysočina
- District: Žďár nad Sázavou
- First mentioned: 1364

Area
  - Total: 4.60 km^{2} (1.78 sq mi)
- Elevation: 505 m (1,657 ft)

Population (2026-01-01)
  - Total: 202
  - Density: 43.9/km^{2} (114/sq mi)
- Time zone: UTC+1 (CET)
  - Summer (DST): UTC+2 (CEST)
- Postal code: 594 51
- Website: www.hornilibochova.cz

Horní Libochová is a municipality and village in Žďár nad Sázavou District in the Vysočina Region of the Czech Republic. It has about 200 inhabitants.

Horní Libochová lies approximately 24 kilometres (15 mi) south-east of Žďár nad Sázavou, 41 km (25 mi) east of Jihlava, and 146 km (91 mi) south-east of Prague.

== Administrative division ==
Horní Libochová consists of three municipal parts (in brackets population according to the 2021 census):

- Horní Libochová (170)
- Dolní Hlíny (13)
- Horní Hlíny (9)

== Demographics ==
Historical population
Year	Pop.	±%
1869	348	—
1880	364	+4.6%
1890	331	−9.1%
1900	298	−10.0%
1910	273	−8.4%
1921	307	+12.5%
1930	281	−8.5%
1950	203	−27.8%
1961	214	+5.4%
1970	226	+5.6%
1980	211	−6.6%
1991	218	+3.3%
2001	215	−1.4%
2011	190	−11.6%
2021	192	+1.1%
Source: Censuses
