= Kotlasy =

- Municipality
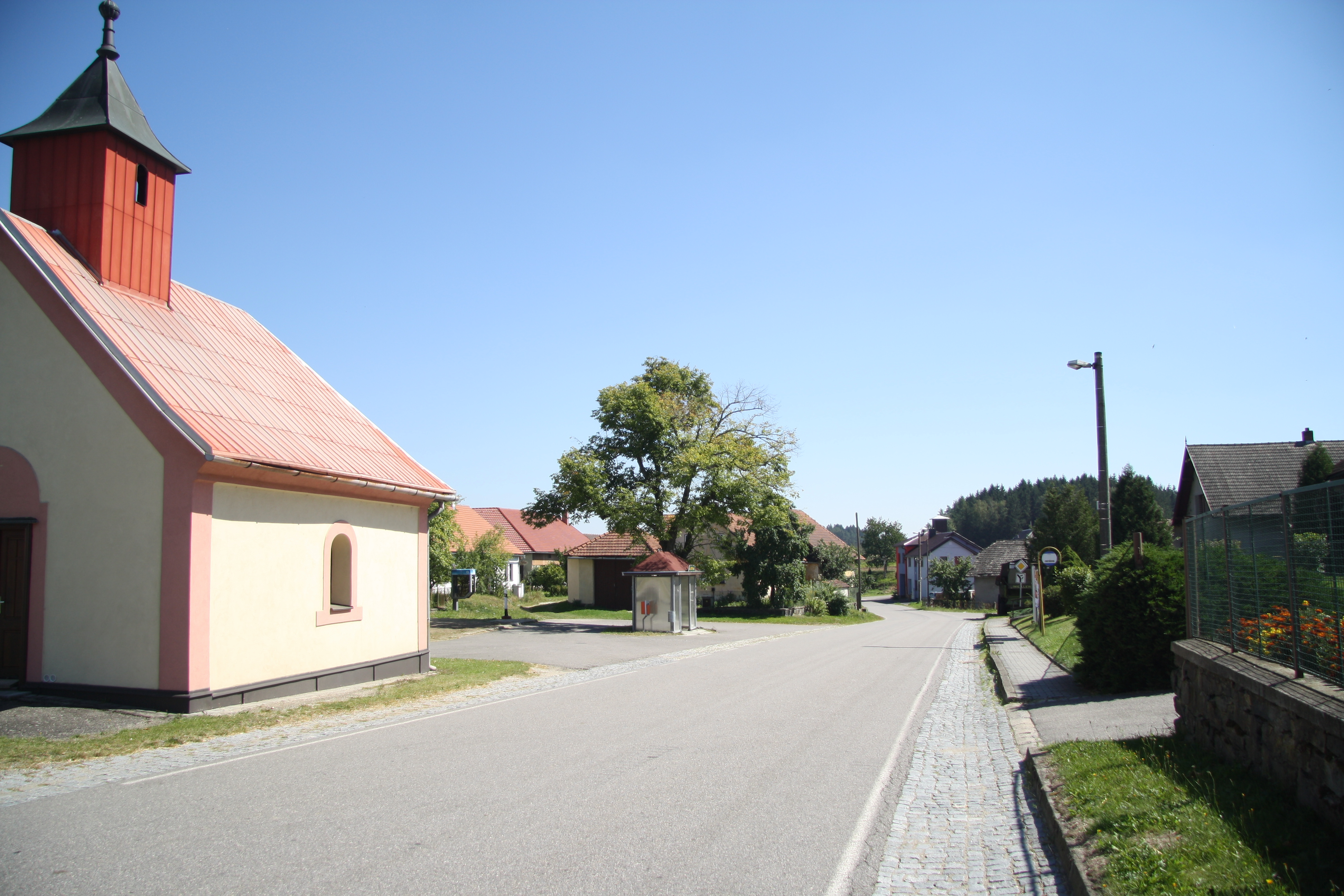
- Centre of Kotlasy

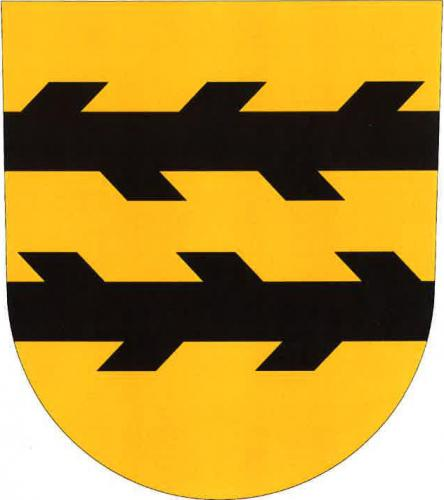
- Flag Coat of arms

- Location in the Czech Republic
- Coordinates: 49°29′34″N 15°56′46″E
- Country: Czech Republic
- Region: Vysočina
- District: Žďár nad Sázavou
- First mentioned: 1349

Area
  - Total: 4.40 km^{2} (1.70 sq mi)
- Elevation: 548 m (1,798 ft)

Population (2026-01-01)
  - Total: 110
  - Density: 25/km^{2} (65/sq mi)
- Time zone: UTC+1 (CET)
  - Summer (DST): UTC+2 (CEST)
- Postal code: 592 14
- Website: www.kotlasy.cz

Kotlasy is a municipality and village in Žďár nad Sázavou District in the Vysočina Region of the Czech Republic. It has about 100 inhabitants.

Kotlasy lies approximately 9 kilometres (6 mi) south of Žďár nad Sázavou, 28 km (17 mi) east of Jihlava, and 129 km (80 mi) south-east of Prague.

== Demographics ==
Historical population
Year	Pop.	±%
1869	197	—
1880	236	+19.8%
1890	235	−0.4%
1900	200	−14.9%
1910	207	+3.5%
1921	220	+6.3%
1930	204	−7.3%
1950	185	−9.3%
1961	188	+1.6%
1970	179	−4.8%
1980	174	−2.8%
1991	163	−6.3%
2001	136	−16.6%
2011	112	−17.6%
2021	103	−8.0%
Source: Censuses
