= Radonín (Žďár nad Sázavou) =

- Village
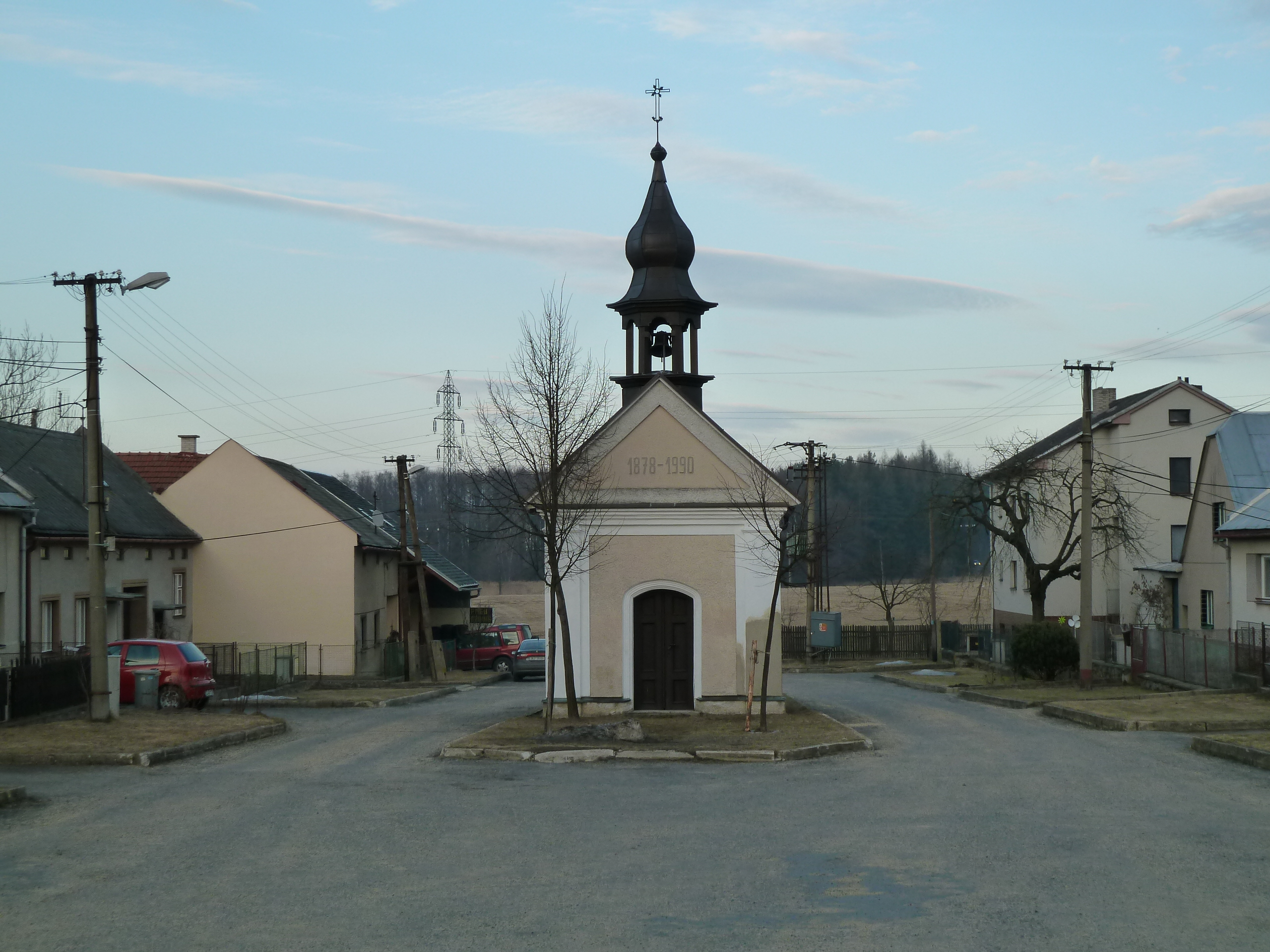
- Chapel of the Virgin Mary

- Location in the Czech Republic
- Coordinates: 49°32′39″N 15°56′1″E
- Country: Czech Republic
- Region: Vysočina
- District: Žďár nad Sázavou
- Municipality: Žďár nad Sázavou
- Founded: 1788

Area
  - Total: 3.98 km^{2} (1.54 sq mi)
- Elevation: 580 m (1,900 ft)

Population (2021)
  - Total: 63
  - Density: 16/km^{2} (41/sq mi)
- Time zone: UTC+1 (CET)
  - Summer (DST): UTC+2 (CEST)
- Postal code: 591 01

Radonín (German: Radonin) is a village and municipal part of Žďár nad Sázavou in Žďár nad Sázavou District in the Vysočina Region of the Czech Republic. It has about 60 inhabitants. It is located in the southern part of the town's territory.

== History ==
Radonín was first mentioned in 1353 as a forest located behind Žďár. The forest was under the administration of the Žďár Monastery. At the beginning of the 15th century, a mill called Hamrmýl (lit. 'hammer mill') was established here. In the 16th century, a fishpond was built near the mill.

In 1788, the mill area was parcelled into the village Hamrmýl, which was later renamed to Radonín.

== Demographics ==
Historical population

| Year | Pop. | ±% |
|---|---|---|
| 1869 | 117 | — |
| 1880 | 125 | +6.8% |
| 1890 | 106 | −15.2% |
| 1900 | 105 | −0.9% |
| 1910 | 109 | +3.8% |

| Year | Pop. | ±% |
|---|---|---|
| 1921 | 88 | −19.3% |
| 1930 | 98 | +11.4% |
| 1950 | 50 | −49.0% |
| 1961 | 58 | +16.0% |
| 1970 | 63 | +8.6% |

| Year | Pop. | ±% |
|---|---|---|
| 1980 | 72 | +14.3% |
| 1991 | 80 | +11.1% |
| 2001 | 71 | −11.3% |
| 2011 | 66 | −7.0% |
| 2021 | 63 | −4.5% |

Source: Censuses

== Transport ==
The road II/353, connecting Žďár nad Sázavou with Velký Beranov, runs through the village.

== Sights ==
The only protected cultural monument in Radonín is the Chapel of the Virgin Mary in the centre of the village. The chapel was built in 1878 and reconstructed in 1990.
