= Žďár nad Sázavou =

- Town
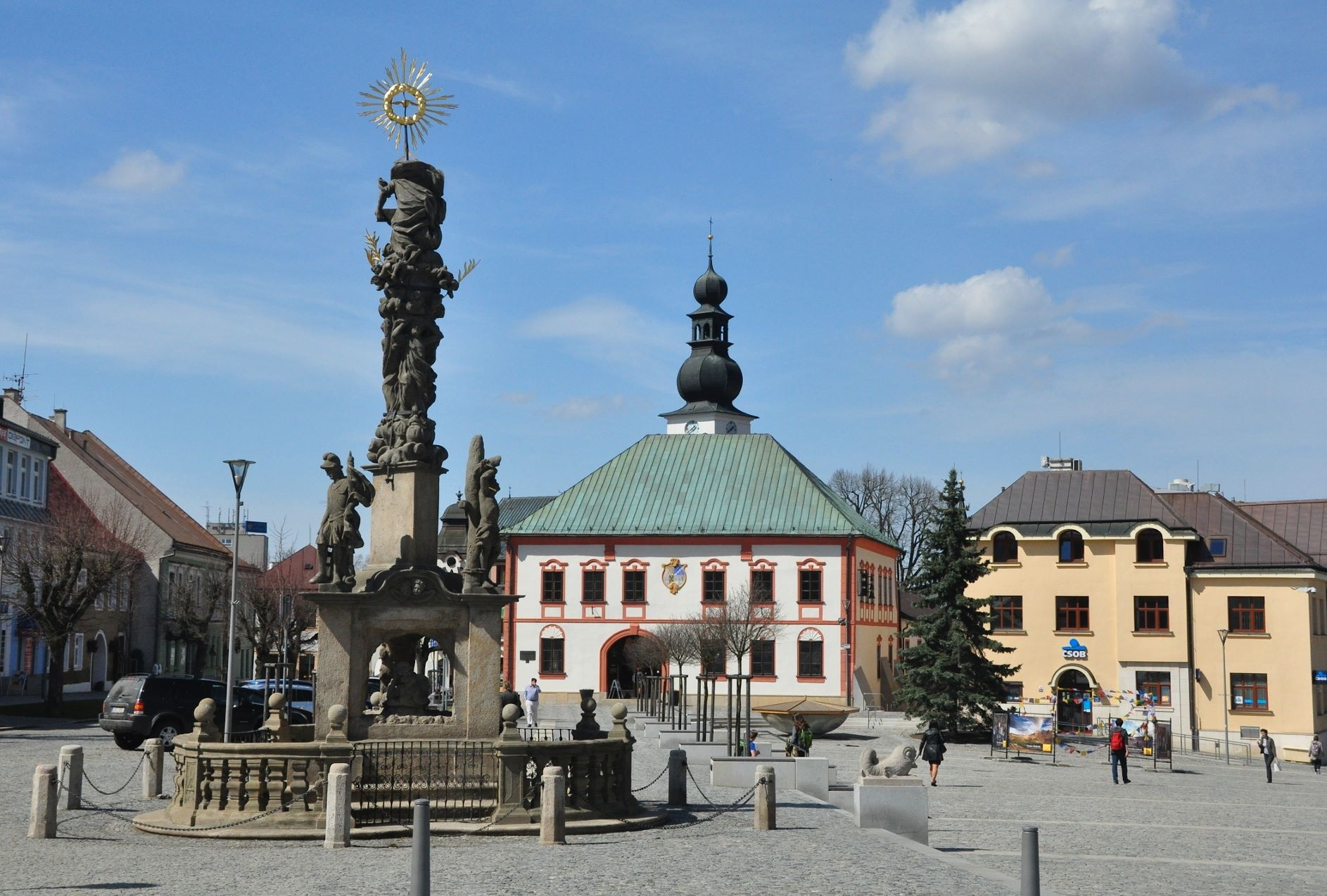
- Main square with the Old Town Hall

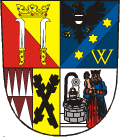
- Flag Coat of arms

- Location in the Czech Republic
- Coordinates: 49°33′46″N 15°56′21″E
- Country: Czech Republic
- Region: Vysočina
- District: Žďár nad Sázavou
- First mentioned: 1253

Government
  - Mayor: Martin Mrkos (STAN)

Area
  - Total: 37.06 km^{2} (14.31 sq mi)
- Elevation: 580 m (1,900 ft)

Population (2026-01-01)
  - Total: 20,247
  - Density: 546.3/km^{2} (1,415/sq mi)
- Time zone: UTC+1 (CET)
  - Summer (DST): UTC+2 (CEST)
- Postal code: 591 01
- Website: www.zdarns.cz

UNESCO World Heritage Site
- Official name: Pilgrimage Church of St. John of Nepomuk at Zelená Hora
- Criteria: iv
- Reference: 690
- Inscription: 1994 (18th Session)

Žďár nad Sázavou (Czech pronunciation: [ˈʒɟaːr ˈnat saːzavou]; German: Saar) is a town in the Vysočina Region of the Czech Republic. It has about 20,000 inhabitants. The town is located on the Sázava River, in the hills of the Křižanov Highlands. The town is both an industrial and tourist centre.

Žďár nad Sázavou was founded in the 13th century. It is known for the Pilgrimage Church of Saint John of Nepomuk, which is a UNESCO World Heritage Site.

== Administrative division ==
Žďár nad Sázavou consists of 12 municipal parts (in brackets population according to the 2021 census):

- Žďár nad Sázavou 1 (3,909)
- Žďár nad Sázavou 2 (2,139)
- Žďár nad Sázavou 3 (4,764)
- Žďár nad Sázavou 4 (2,608)
- Žďár nad Sázavou 5 (1,598)
- Žďár nad Sázavou 6 (3,069)
- Žďár nad Sázavou 7 (1,342)
- Žďár nad Sázavou 8 (76)
- Mělkovice (127)
- Radonín (63)
- Stržanov (266)
- Veselíčko (163)

== Etymology ==
Žďár is a common Czech toponym. In the Middle Ages, the Old Czech word žďár denoted a place where the forest had been cleared and burned to make way for meadows and fields.

== Geography ==
Žďár nad Sázavou is located about 30 kilometres (19 mi) northeast of Jihlava and 60 km (37 mi) northwest of Brno. It lies in a hilly landscape of the Křižanov Highlands and is one of the highest municipalities in the country with a population of over 10,000. The highest point is the hill Holý kopec at 665 m (2,182 ft) above sea level.

Žďár nad Sázavou is situated on the Sázava River. The municipal territory is rich in fishponds. The largest body of water is Pilská Reservoir, which was built in 1959–1962 and today it serves as a recreational area, for fishing and as protection against floods.

== History ==
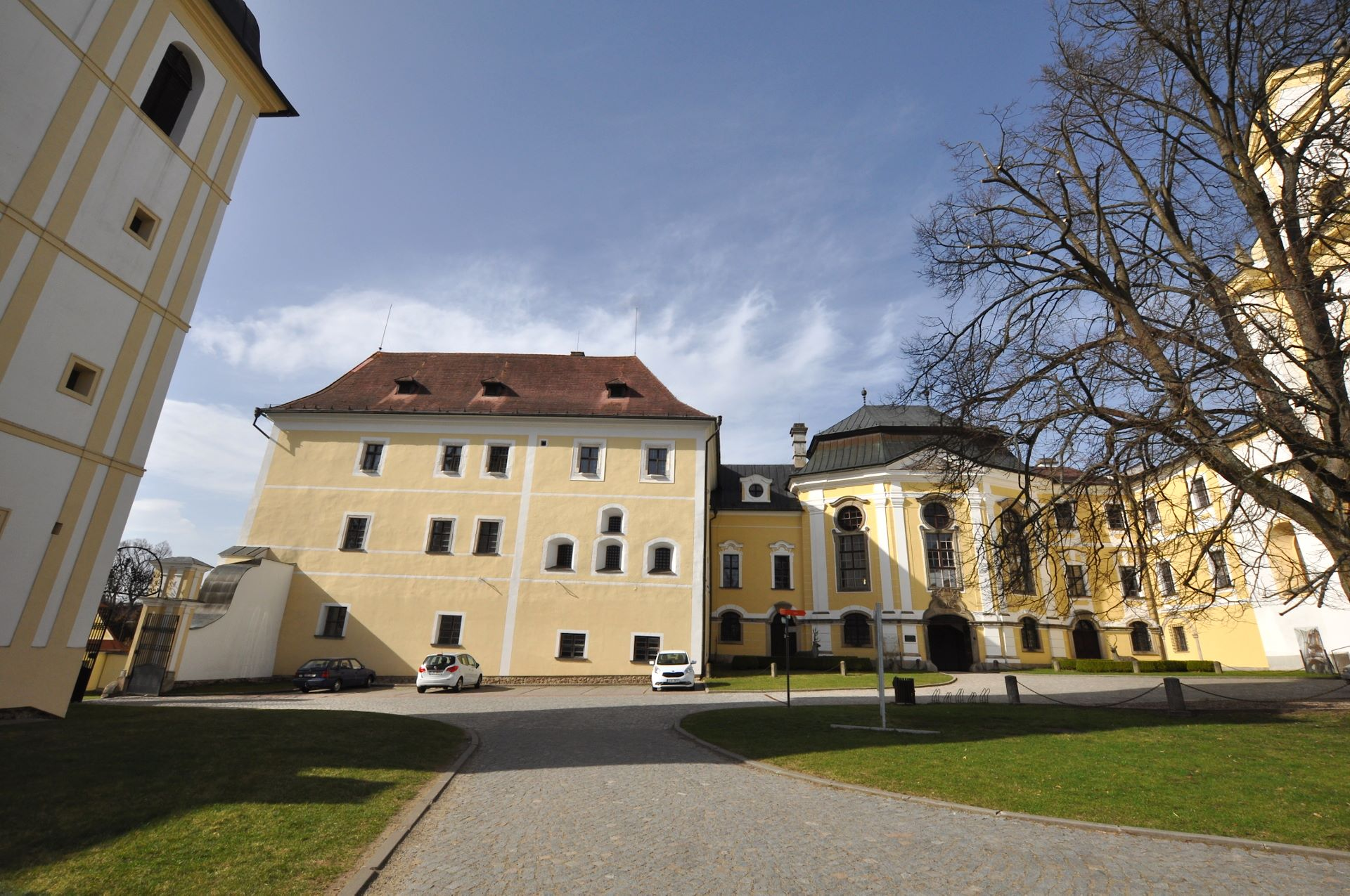
Žďár nad Sázavou Castle, formerly a Cistercian monastery

Žďár was founded as a settlement of the nearby Cistercian monastery, which was established in 1252. The original settlement was soon moved on the left bank of the Sázava, in the site of today's historic centre. In 1293, Žďár was first referred to as a market town.

From 1588, Žďár came under administration of Olomouc bishopric, but remained loyal to the Cistercian monastery, which resulted in a long-running dispute. In 1606, the monastery was abolished and the dispute settled down. In 1607, Žďár was promoted to a town. The monastery was rebuilt into a castle in 1614. In 1638, the monastery was restored, but was attacked by Swedish army during the Thirty Years' War. The town was ransacked in 1645. After it was destroyed by a great fire, the monastery was abolished in 1784.

In the second half of the 19th century, Žďár developed both culturally and economically. In 1898 and 1905, railways were constructed. The first factories were established and part of the old town was rebuilt.

After World War II, a large engineering and foundry company ŽĎAS was founded and the population significantly increased. New suburbs were created and in the 1970s the entire historic centre was rebuilt.

== Demographics ==
Historical population

Year	Pop.	±%
1869	4,338	—
1880	4,026	−7.2%
1890	3,842	−4.6%
1900	4,124	+7.3%
1910	4,666	+13.1%

Year	Pop.	±%
1921	4,655	−0.2%
1930	4,674	+0.4%
1950	4,936	+5.6%
1961	10,305	+108.8%
1970	15,686	+52.2%

Year	Pop.	±%
1980	20,864	+33.0%
1991	23,191	+11.2%
2001	24,289	+4.7%
2011	22,328	−8.1%
2021	20,124	−9.9%

Source: Censuses

== Economy ==
The engineering and foundry company ŽĎAS was founded in 1951 and to this day is still one of the most important employers in the region. Other large industrial employers based in the town include Cooper-Standard Automotive ČR (manufacturer of car parts), Hettich ČR (manufacturer of furniture fittings) and Tokoz (Czech manufacturer of keys and fittings).

== Transport ==
The town lies at the crossroads of two first class roads: I/19 (from Havlíčkův Brod to with the Kunštát) and I/37 (connecting Pardubice with the D1 motorway in Velká Bíteš).

Žďár nad Sázavou is situated on a major railway link from Prague to Brno, further continuing to Slovakia, Austria and Hungary. It is also the starting point of the lines to Kolín, Velké Meziříčí, Nové Město na Moravě and Tišnov. In addition to the main station, there is a stop in Veselíčko.

== Sights ==
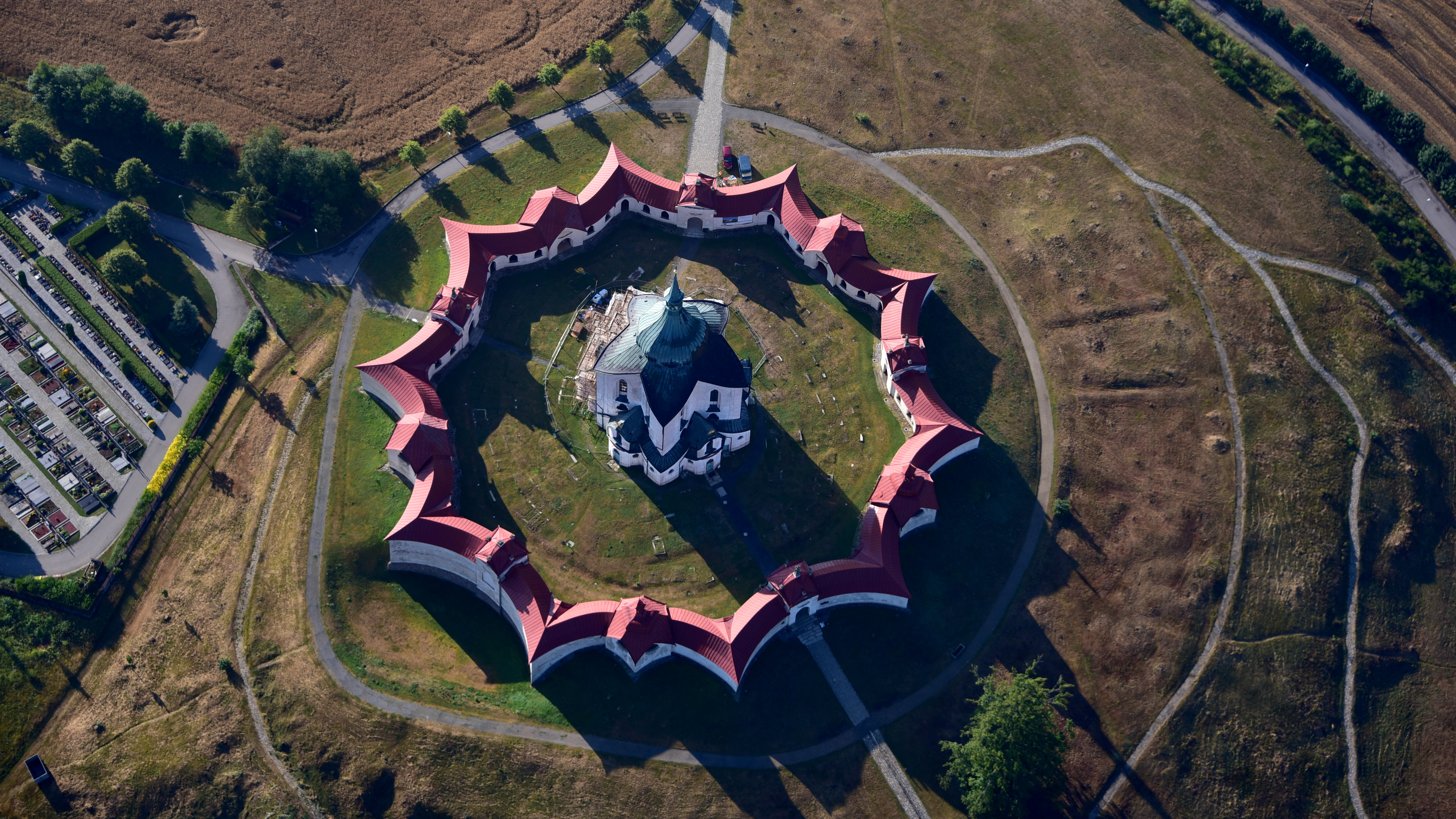
Church of Saint John of Nepomuk

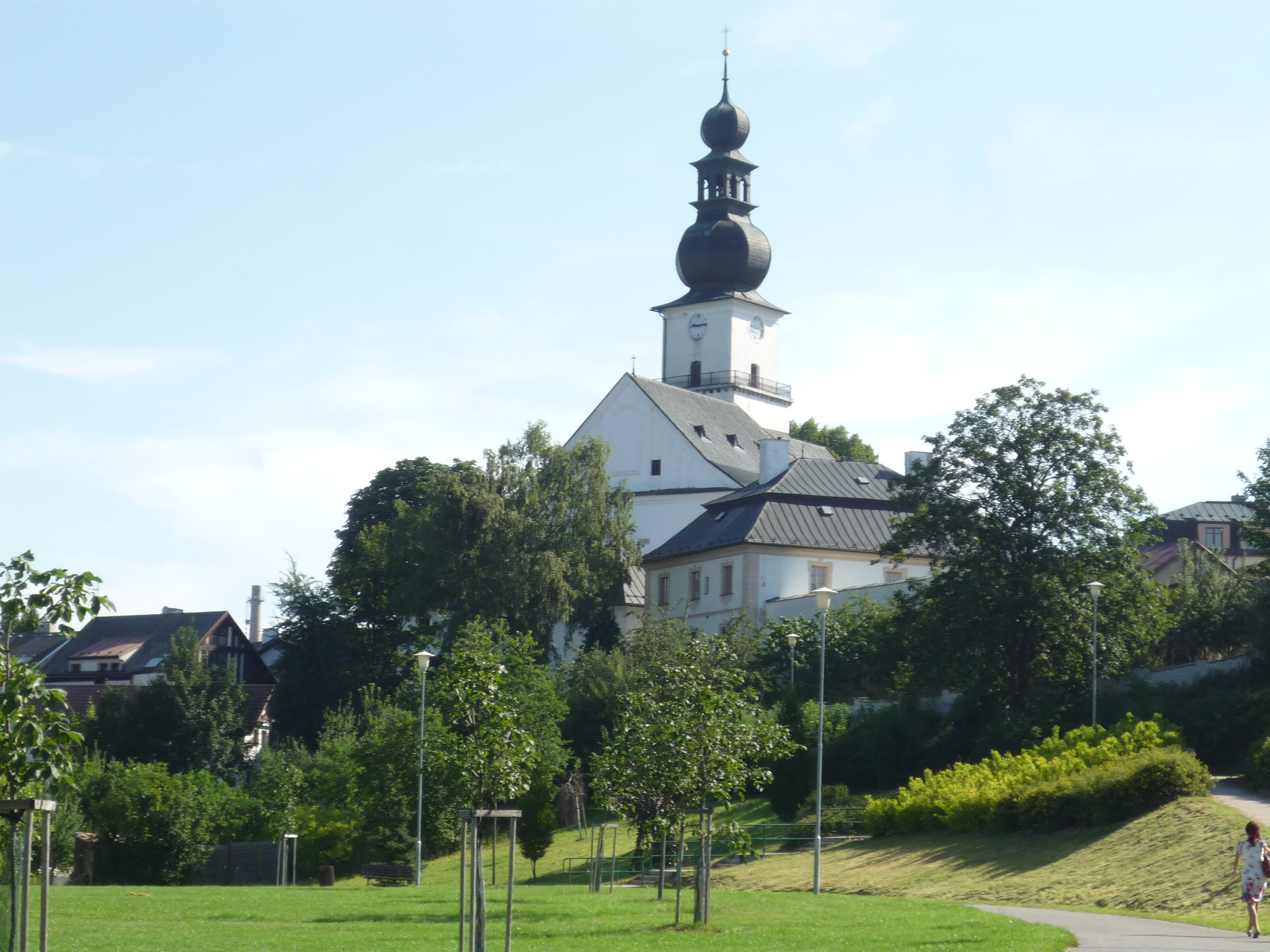
Church of Saint Procopius

Žďár nad Sázavou is best known for the Pilgrimage Church of Saint John of Nepomuk, a UNESCO World Heritage Site located on the hill Zelená hora. It was designed by Jan Santini Aichel. It was built in the Baroque style in 1719–1722.

Žďár nad Sázavou Castle today serves cultural purposes and houses the New Generation Museum – an audiovisual museum presenting the history of the castle complex and other important buildings in the region. Part of the complex is the Basilica of Our Lady of the Assumption and St. Nicholas of the former monastery.

In the centre of the town is the Church of Saint Procopius. The parish church was first mentioned in 1391 and rebuilt in the late Gothic style in 1560. The church tower is open to the public. Next to the church is the Chapel of Saint Barbara, built in the Baroque style in 1729.

The main sight of the town square is the Old Town Hall, a Renaissance building from the turn of the 16th and 17th centuries with Neoclassical façade from the 18th century.

Post-secondary Vocational School Žďár nad Sázavou exhibits its collection in the Museum of Computer Technology.

== Notable people ==
- František Drdla (1868–1944), violinist and composer
- Tomáš Rolinek (born 1980), ice hockey player
- Petr Koukal (born 1982), ice hockey player
- Eva Vítečková (born 1982), basketball player

== Twin towns – sister cities ==
Žďár nad Sázavou is twinned with:

- Cairanne, France
- Flobecq, Belgium
- Khust, Ukraine
- Leszno, Poland
- Schmölln, Germany
