= Svratka (river) =

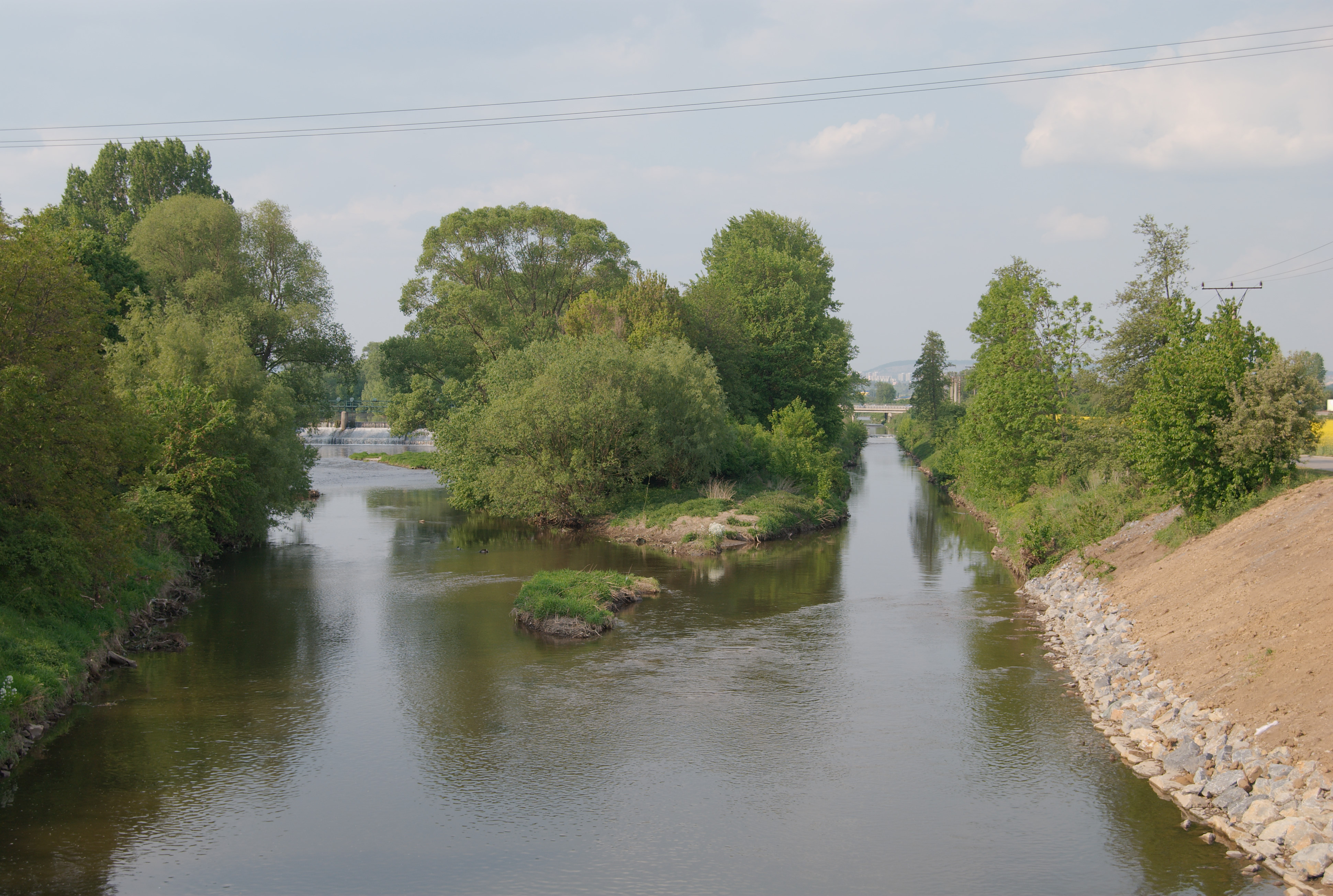
- Confluence of the Svratka (left) and Svitava

Location
- Country: Czech Republic
- Regions: Vysočina; South Moravian

Physical characteristics
- Source
  - location: Cikháj, Upper Svratka Highlands
  - coordinates: 49°38′38″N 15°59′57″E
  - elevation: 772 m (2,533 ft)
- Mouth
  - location: Thaya
  - coordinates: 48°54′16″N 16°36′44″E
  - elevation: 163 m (535 ft)
- Length: 168.5 km (104.7 mi)
- Basin size: 7,115.6 km^{2} (2,747.3 sq mi)
- Discharge
  - average: 27.24 m^{3}/s (962 cu ft/s) near estuary

Basin features
- Progression: Thaya→ Morava→ Danube→ Black Sea

The Svratka (Czech pronunciation: [ˈsvratka]; German: Schwarzach) is a river in the Czech Republic, a left tributary of the Thaya River. It flows through the Vysočina and South Moravian regions, including the city of Brno. It is 168.5 km (104.7 mi) long, making it the 9th longest river in the Czech Republic.

== Etymology ==
The name probably originates from the Proto-Slavic verb vort ('return'; vrátit in modern Czech) and from the Old Czech verb sworti ('meander'). So it meant "returning (meandering) river". There is also a theory is that the name was derived from the Germanic Swarta, which meant 'black water'. Sometimes the river was colloquially referred to as Švarcava or Švorcava.

== Characteristic ==
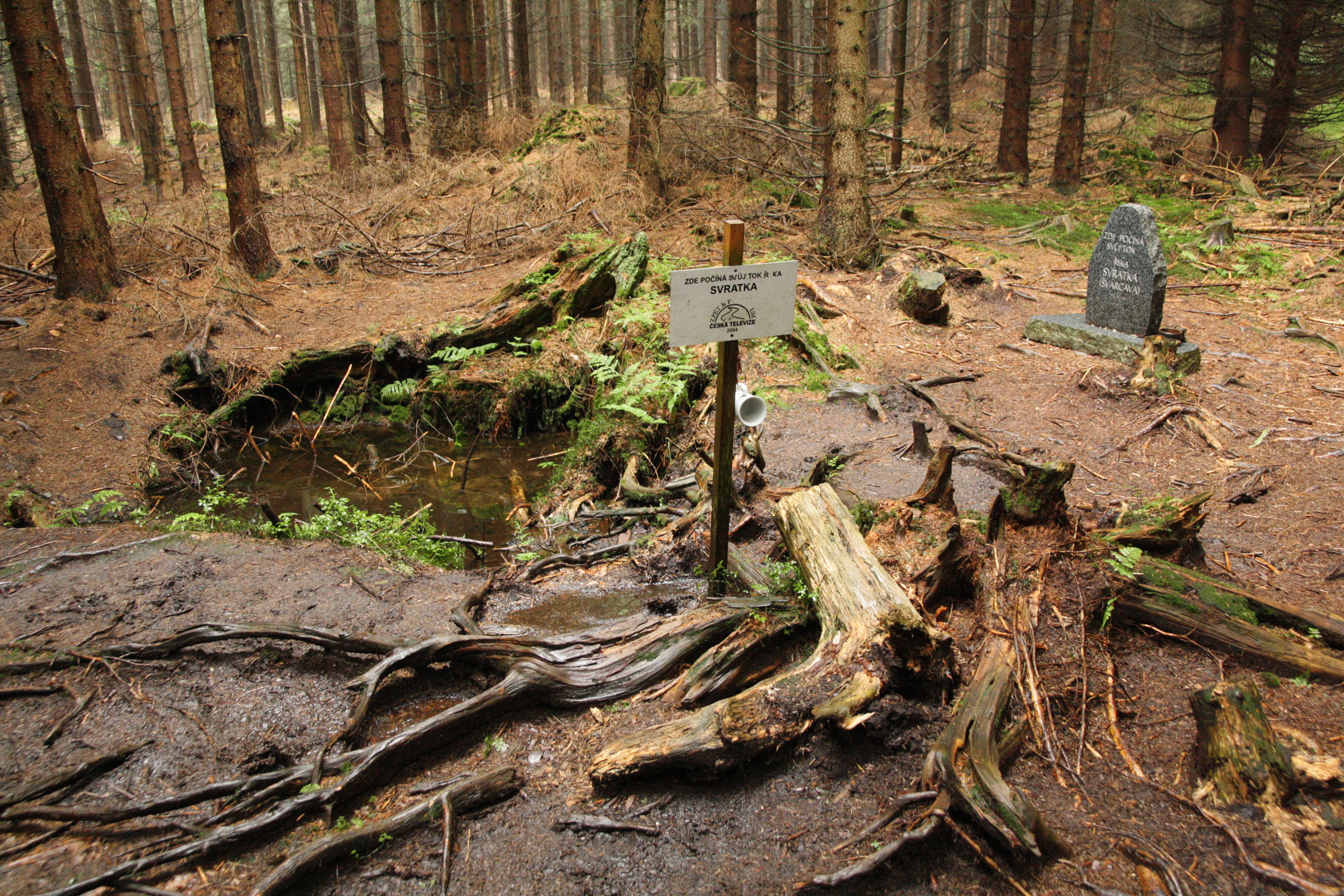
The source of the Svratka

The Svratka originates in the territory of Cikháj in the Upper Svratka Highlands at an elevation of 772 m (2,533 ft) and flows to the Nové Mlýny reservoirs, where it enters the Thaya River in Dolní Věstonice at an elevation of 163 m (535 ft). It is 168.5 km (104.7 mi) long, making it the 9th longest river in the Czech Republic. Its drainage basin has an area of 7,115.6 km^{2} (2,747.3 sq mi).

The longest tributaries of the Svratka are:

Tributary	Length (km)	River km	Side
Jihlava	180.8	0.1	right
Svitava	98.4	40.7	left
Bobrůvka	62.6	78.9	right
Litava	58.6	29.0	left
Bobrava	37.6	36.8	right
Bílý potok	36.0	67.0	right
Šatava	32.0	9.9	right
Nedvědička	30.2	89.1	right
Bystřice	26.2	113.5	right
Hodonínka	24.4	103.0	left
Lubě	24.1	73.7	left
Fryšávka	23.8	125.5	right

== Course ==
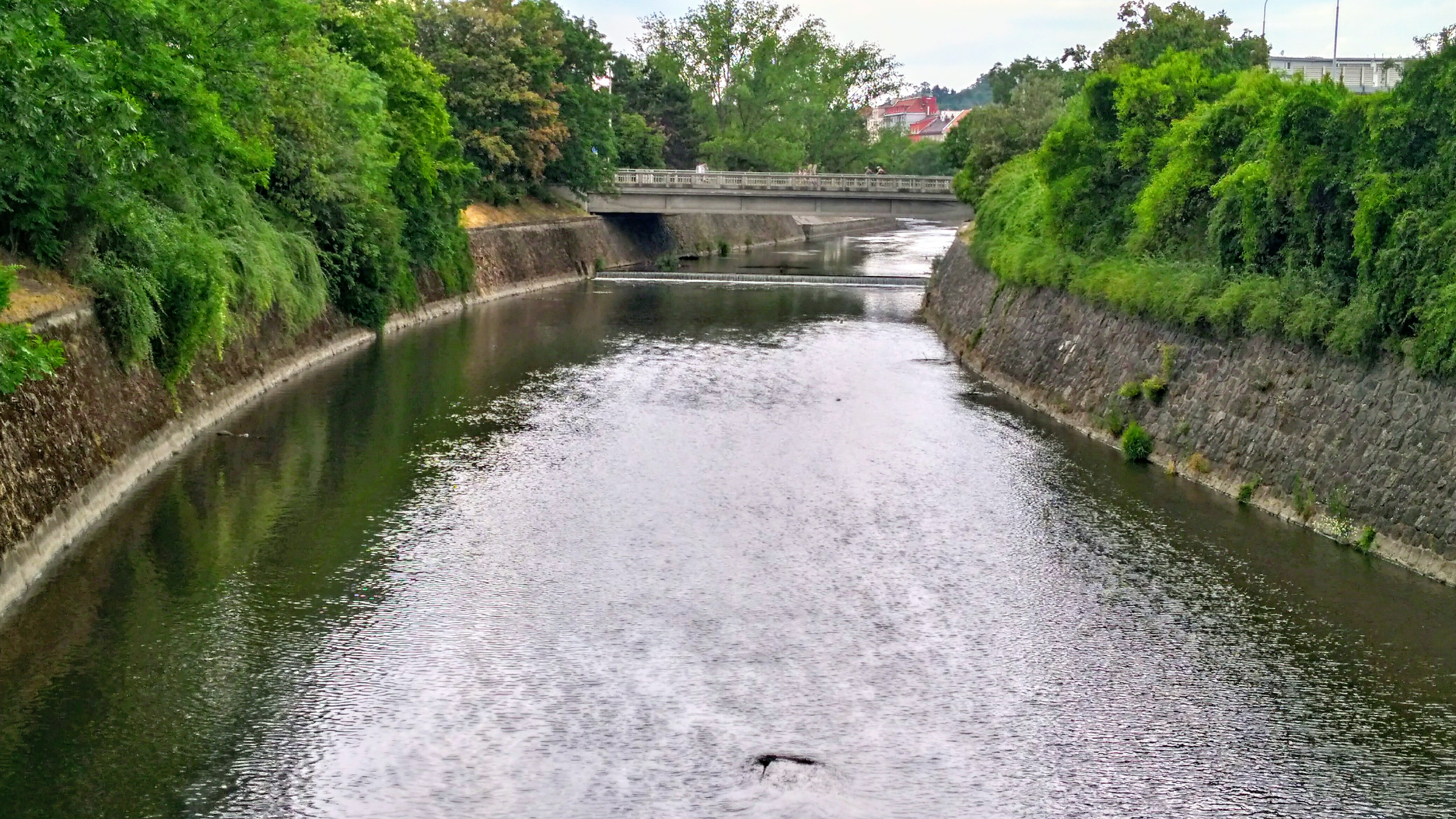
The Svratka in Brno

The most notable settlement on the Svratka is the city of Brno, where the Svitava flows into the river. The river flows past the following municipalities: Cikháj, Herálec, Svratka, Křižánky, Březiny, Krásné, Spělkov, Telecí, Borovnice, Jimramov, Strachujov, Unčín, Dalečín, Chlum-Korouhvice, Vír, Koroužné, Štěpánov nad Svratkou, Ujčov, Nedvědice, Černvír, Doubravník, Borač, Štěpánovice, Tišnov, Veverská Bítýška, Brno, Modřice, Rajhrad, Židlochovice, Nosislav, Velké Němčice, Vranovice, Pouzdřany, Ivaň and Dolní Věstonice.

In the section from Březiny to Borovnice, the river forms the border between the Vysočina and Pardubice regions. In the section from Herálec to Jimramov, the river also forms the border between the historical lands of Bohemia and Moravia.

== Bodies of water ==
The reservoirs Brno (259 ha (640 acres)), Vír I (224 ha (550 acres)) and Vír II (13 ha (32 acres)) are built on the Svratka. The largest body of water in the basin area is the Dalešice Reservoir with an area of 463 ha (1,140 acres), which is built on the Jihlava River. There are 4,942 bodies of water in the basin area.

== Protection of nature ==
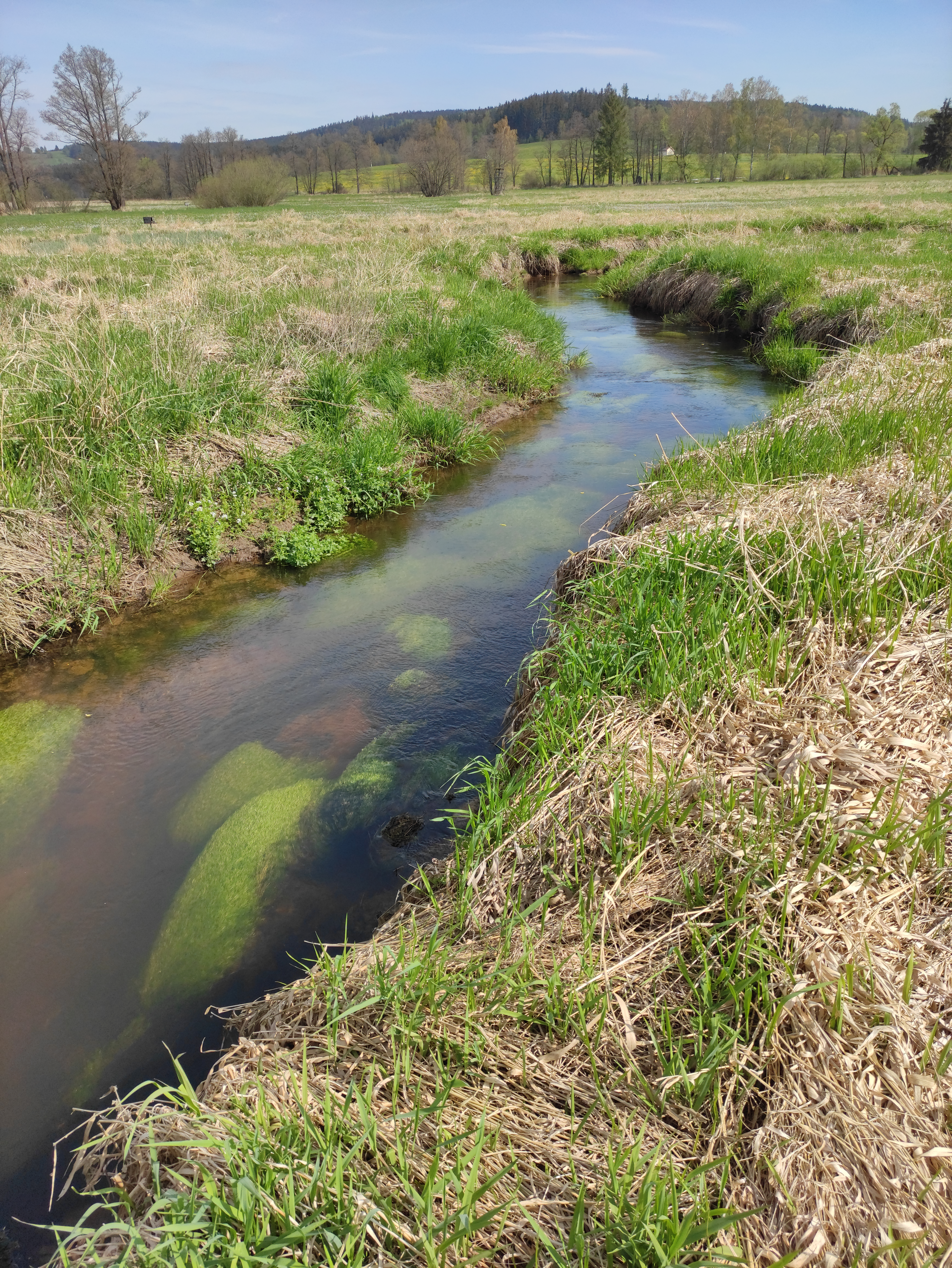
Meandry Svratky u Milov Nature Reserve

The upper course of the river, including its spring, is located within the protected landscape area of Žďárské vrchy.

A meandering section of the Svratka near the village of Milovy is protected as the Meandry Svratky u Milov Nature Reserve. It has an area of 60.6 ha (150 acres). This area of fens and peat bogs is a habitat of macrophyte vegetation and associated animal species. These include many protected species, e.g. brook lamprey and corn crake, which are critically endangered within the Czech Republic.

A short section of the Svratka in the municipality of Ujčov is protected as the Svratka Nature Monument. It has an area of 0.4 ha (1 acre). It is protected because of the occurrence of the ostrich fern, endangered in the Czech Republic.

== Tourism ==
The Svratka is among the popular rivers for river tourism. Two of its sections are navigable for paddlers; however, the upper section is navigable only during the spring thaw and after heavy rains, and the lower section depends on the discharge of the Vír I and Vír II reservoirs. A short slalom channel is built between Vír I and Vír II.
