= Telecí =

- Municipality
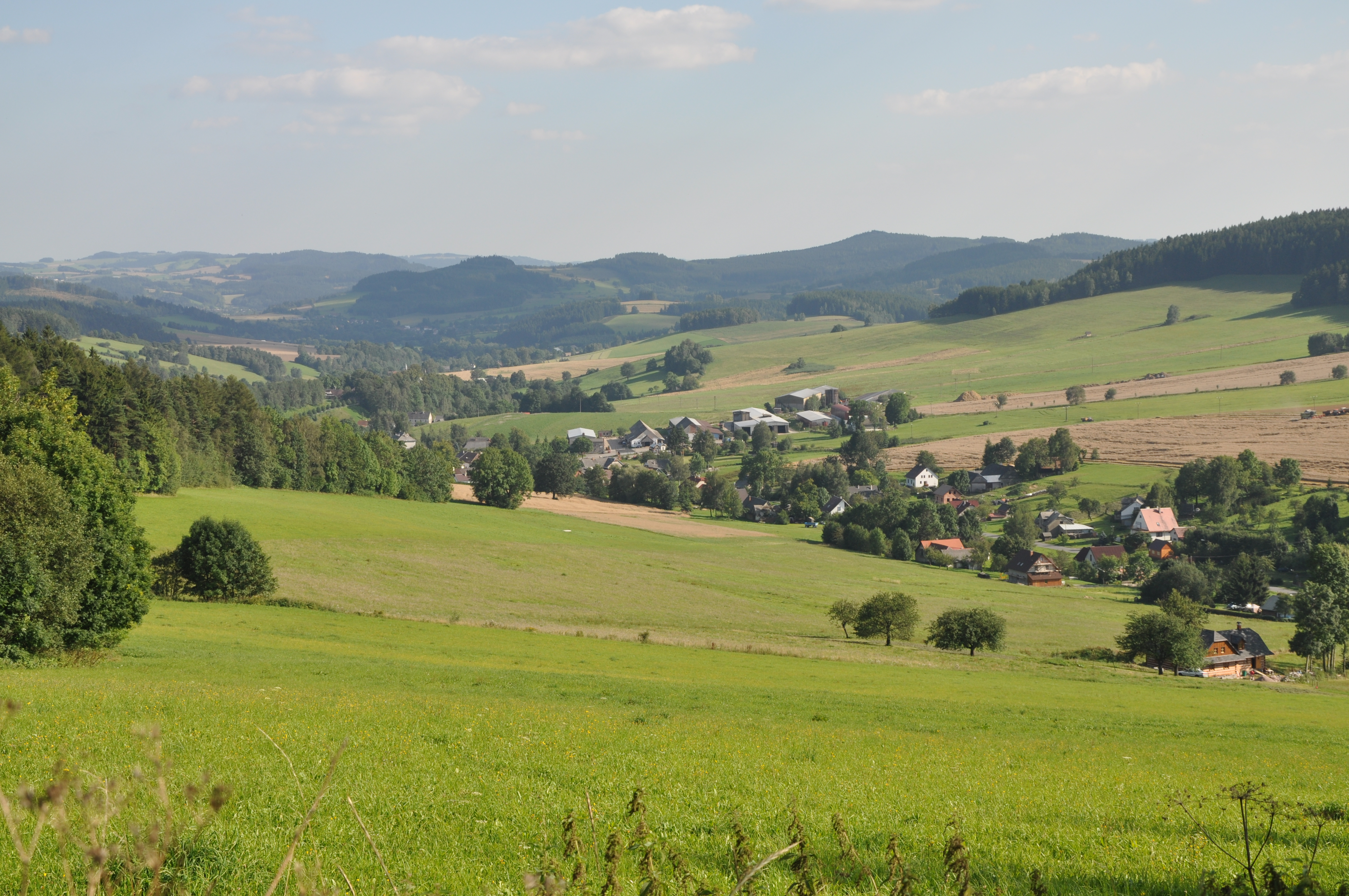
- View from the north

- Flag Coat of arms

- Location in the Czech Republic
- Coordinates: 49°41′42″N 16°10′52″E
- Country: Czech Republic
- Region: Pardubice
- District: Svitavy
- First mentioned: 1403

Area
  - Total: 12.61 km^{2} (4.87 sq mi)
- Elevation: 578 m (1,896 ft)

Population (2026-01-01)
  - Total: 412
  - Density: 32.7/km^{2} (84.6/sq mi)
- Time zone: UTC+1 (CET)
  - Summer (DST): UTC+2 (CEST)
- Postal code: 569 94
- Website: www.teleci.cz

Telecí is a municipality and village in Svitavy District in the Pardubice Region of the Czech Republic. It has about 400 inhabitants. The municipality is located in the Upper Svratka Highlands, near the Svratka River.

The southern part of Telecí is well preserved and is protected as a village monument zone. The homestead No. 16 is one of the most valuable examples of vernacular architecture in the Czech Republic as is protected as a national cultural monument.

== Etymology ==
The name was derived either from the Czech adjective telecí (i.e. 'calf'), or from the surname Telecí. The name may have had a figurative meaning and could mean 'stupid'.

== Geography ==
Telecí is located about 21 kilometres (13 mi) west of Svitavy and 47 km (29 mi) southeast of Pardubice. It lies in the Upper Svratka Highlands. The highest point is the hill Landrátský kopec at 742 m (2,434 ft) above sea level. The Svratka River flows along the southern municipal border. The village is situated along the stream Telecký potok, which originates in the northern part of the municipality and then flows to the Svratka. The entire municipality lies within the Žďárské vrchy Protected Landscape Area.

== History ==
The first written mention of Telecí is from 1403. The village was probably founded in the second half of the 13th century.

== Demographics ==
Historical population

Year	Pop.	±%
1869	1,126	—
1880	1,130	+0.4%
1890	1,150	+1.8%
1900	1,097	−4.6%
1910	1,068	−2.6%

Year	Pop.	±%
1921	952	−10.9%
1930	904	−5.0%
1950	676	−25.2%
1961	634	−6.2%
1970	545	−14.0%

Year	Pop.	±%
1980	503	−7.7%
1991	454	−9.7%
2001	409	−9.9%
2011	384	−6.1%
2021	418	+8.9%

Source: Censuses

== Transport ==
There are no railways or major roads passing through the municipality.

== Sights ==
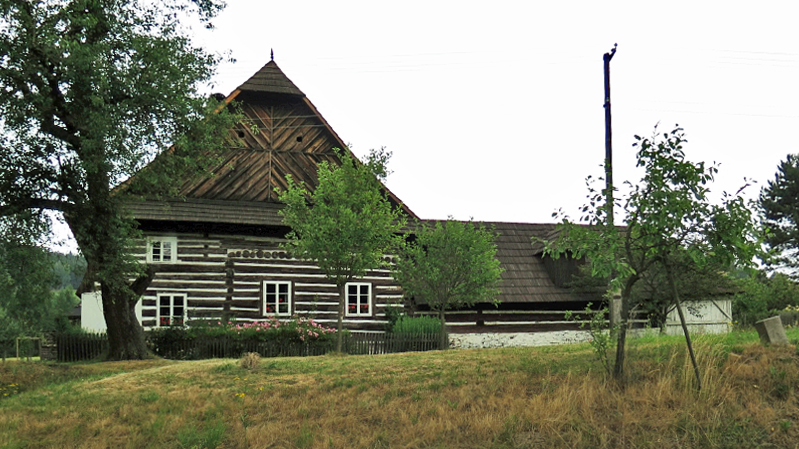
Homestead No. 16

The southern part of the village is protected as a village monument zone due to the large number of preserved half-timbered houses, which are examples of local vernacular architecture. Telecí belongs to the Polička region, which is one of the few areas in the Czech Republic where buildings from before the Battle of White Mountain and the Thirty Years' War have been preserved. Typical of local houses are their wooden gables (so-called lomenice), assembled into decorative patterns.

The most important monument, protected as a national cultural monument, is the homestead No. 16. It is the most valuable and best-preserved timbered homestead in the region. Its oldest part dates from the period 1564–1566 and the newest part dates from the end of the 18th century. The house has undergone a complex construction development and has preserved authentic building structures and details. The barn next to the house dates from 1817.

The main landmarks of Telecí are the Church of Saint Mary Magdalene and the Evangelical church. The Church of Saint Mary Magdalene was built in the Gothic style at the end of the 14th century and modified in the Baroque style. Next to the church is a separate bell tower with a wooden floor, built also at the end of the 14th century.
