= Cikháj =

- Municipality
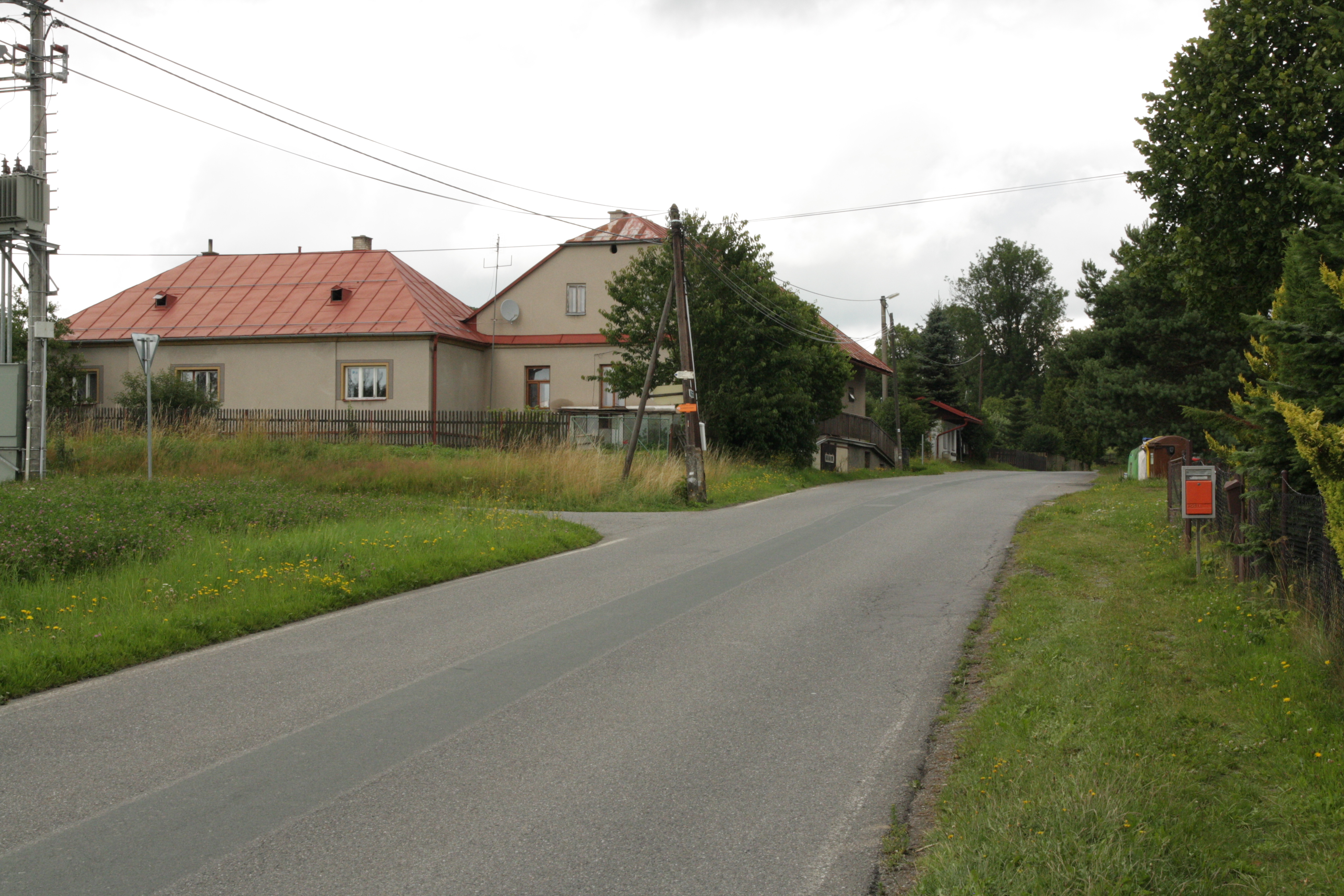
- Crossroads in the centre of Cikháj

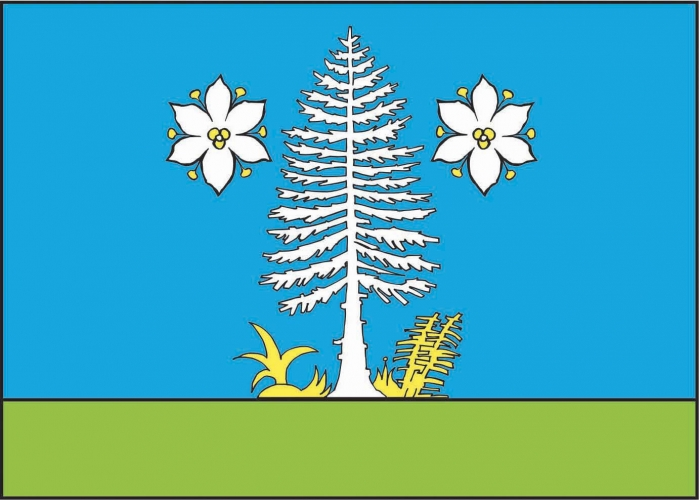
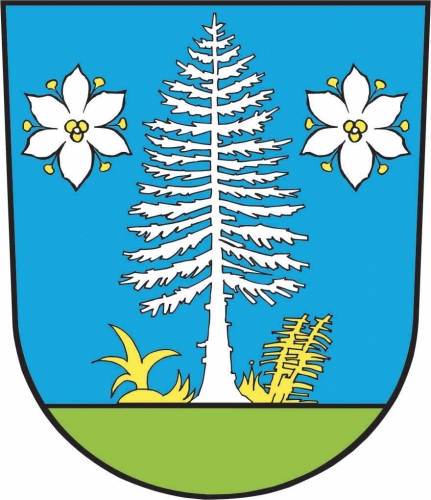
- Flag Coat of arms

- Location in the Czech Republic
- Coordinates: 49°38′42″N 15°58′3″E
- Country: Czech Republic
- Region: Vysočina
- District: Žďár nad Sázavou
- First mentioned: 1662

Area
  - Total: 21.35 km^{2} (8.24 sq mi)
- Elevation: 675 m (2,215 ft)

Population (2026-01-01)
  - Total: 101
  - Density: 4.73/km^{2} (12.3/sq mi)
- Time zone: UTC+1 (CET)
  - Summer (DST): UTC+2 (CEST)
- Postal code: 591 02
- Website: www.cikhaj.cz

Cikháj (German: Ziegenhain) is a municipality and village in Žďár nad Sázavou District in the Vysočina Region of the Czech Republic. It has about 100 inhabitants.

== Etymology ==
The name has its origin probably in the Czech word žíhání that once meant 'slash-and-burn'. The German name Ziegenhain was derived from the Czech name, meaning 'goat grove'. The name Cikháj was then created by transliterating the German name back into Czech.

== Geography ==
Cikháj is located about 9 kilometres (6 mi) north of Žďár nad Sázavou and 38 km (24 mi) northeast of Jihlava. It lies in the Upper Svratka Highlands. The highest point is the hill Žákova hora at 810 m (2,660 ft) above sea level. Two important Czech rivers originate in the municipal territory: the Sázava originates in the woods in the northwest and the Svratka originates in the woods in the east.

The municipality lies within the Žďárské vrchy Protected Landscape Area. The southern slopes of the hill Žákova hora are protected as a national nature reserve.

== History ==
The first written mention of Cikháj is from 1662.

== Demographics ==
Historical population

Year	Pop.	±%
1869	445	—
1880	372	−16.4%
1890	368	−1.1%
1900	341	−7.3%
1910	342	+0.3%

Year	Pop.	±%
1921	342	+0.0%
1930	319	−6.7%
1950	209	−34.5%
1961	193	−7.7%
1970	150	−22.3%

Year	Pop.	±%
1980	119	−20.7%
1991	113	−5.0%
2001	110	−2.7%
2011	97	−11.8%
2021	102	+5.2%

Source: Censuses

== Transport ==
There are no railways or major roads passing through the municipality.

== Sights ==
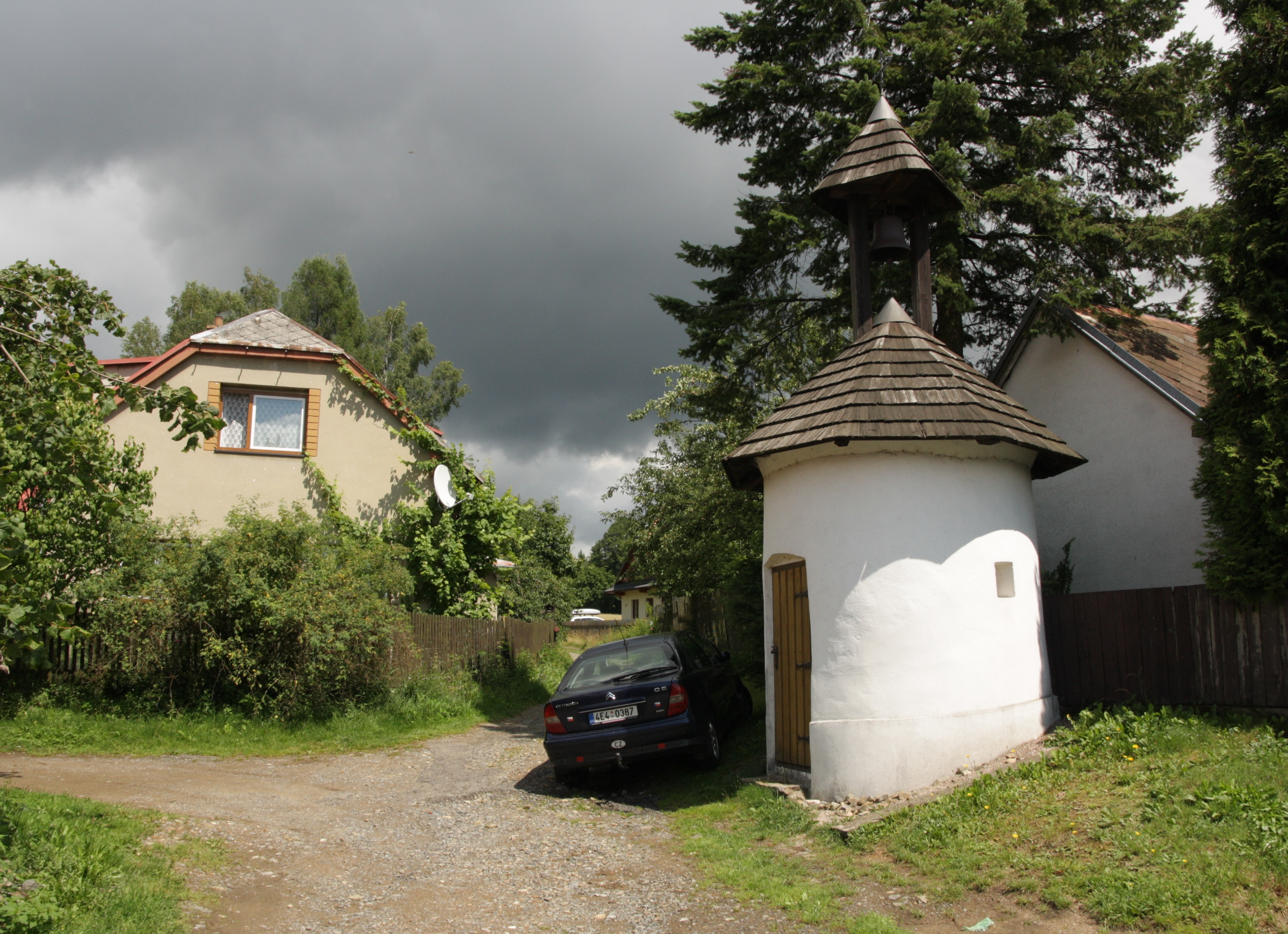
Belfry

There are no significant historical monuments in the municipality, but there are several small monuments: a stone folk belfry from the 19th century, a former water mill from 1848 without preserved equipment, a cast iron cross from 1885 and a calvary from 1713.
