= Štěpánov nad Svratkou =

- Market town
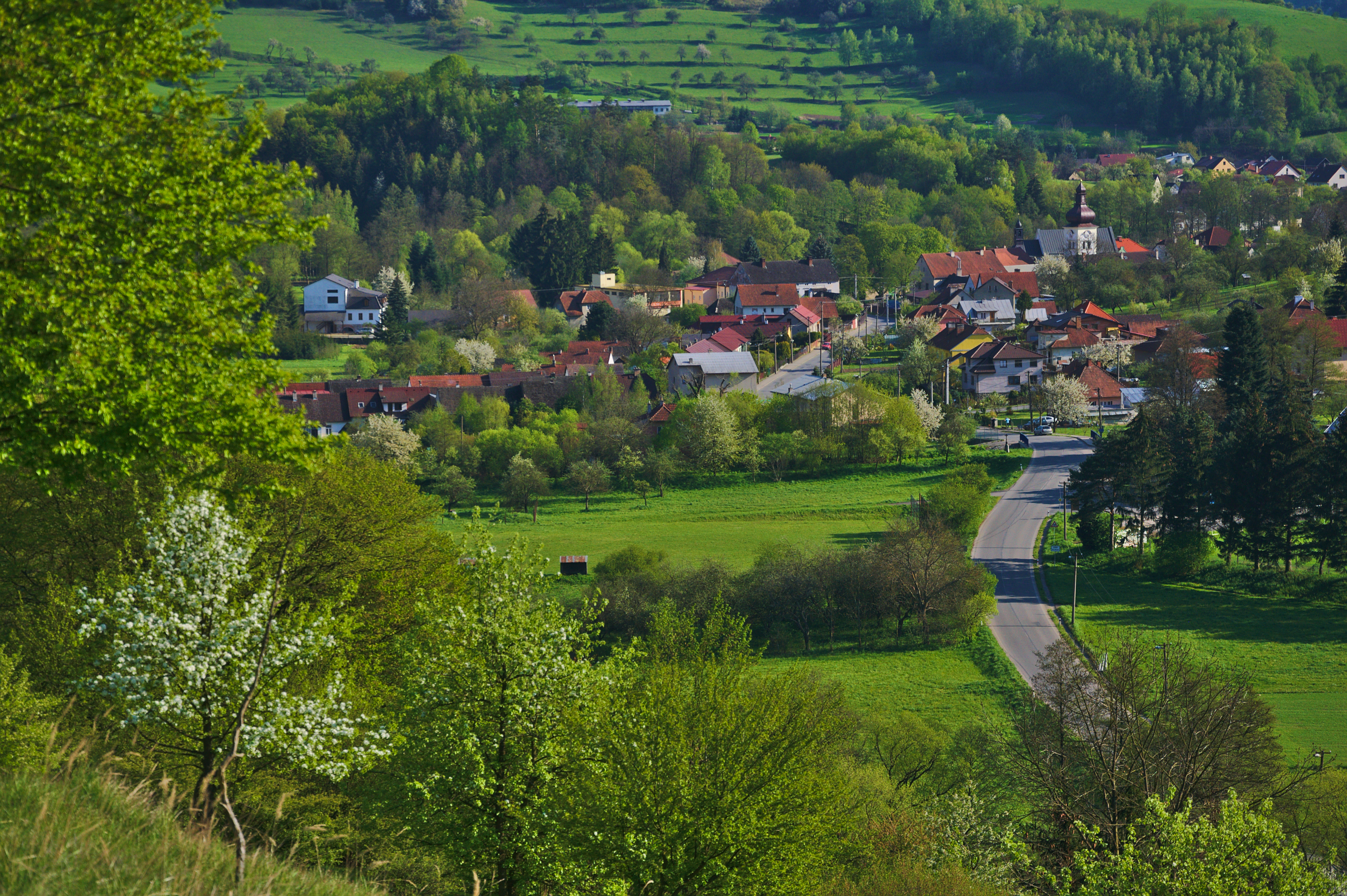
- View from the north

- Flag Coat of arms

- Location in the Czech Republic
- Coordinates: 49°30′17″N 16°20′21″E
- Country: Czech Republic
- Region: Vysočina
- District: Žďár nad Sázavou
- First mentioned: 1285

Area
  - Total: 10.85 km^{2} (4.19 sq mi)
- Elevation: 346 m (1,135 ft)

Population (2026-01-01)
  - Total: 722
  - Density: 66.5/km^{2} (172/sq mi)
- Time zone: UTC+1 (CET)
  - Summer (DST): UTC+2 (CEST)
- Postal codes: 592 63, 593 01
- Website: www.stepanovnadsvratkou.cz

Štěpánov nad Svratkou (Czech pronunciation: [ˈʃcɛpaːnof ˈnat svratkou]; until 1951 Štěpánov; German: Stiepanau) is a market town in Žďár nad Sázavou District in the Vysočina Region of the Czech Republic. It has about 700 inhabitants. It lies on the Svratka River.

== Administrative division ==
Štěpánov nad Svratkou consists of two municipal parts (in brackets population according to the 2021 census):

- Štěpánov nad Svratkou (646)
- Vrtěžíř (48)

== Geography ==
Štěpánov nad Svratkou is located about 29 kilometres (18 mi) east of Žďár nad Sázavou and 36 km (22 mi) northwest of Brno. It lies in the Upper Svratka Highlands. The highest point is at 643 m (2,110 ft) above sea level. The built-up area is situated in the valley of the Svratka River and its tributary, the Hodonínka Stream.

== History ==
The first written mention of Štěpánov is in a deed of Bishop Dětřich from 1285. The village was founded by Štěpán of Medlov between 1234 and 1256. Silver, copper and iron ore were mined in the area from the 13th century and Štěpánov became an industrial centre of the estate. It was first referred to as a market town in 1551, but it was not officially promoted to a market town until sometime between 1561 and 1584. During the 18th century, mining has stopped.

In 1951, Štěpánov was merged with the neighbouring municipality of Olešnička (today an integral part of Štěpánov) and the name of the settlement and the municipality was changed to Štěpánov nad Svratkou.

== Demographics ==
Historical population

Year	Pop.	±%
1869	1,203	—
1880	1,079	−10.3%
1890	1,094	+1.4%
1900	1,093	−0.1%
1910	1,113	+1.8%

Year	Pop.	±%
1921	1,042	−6.4%
1930	1,038	−0.4%
1950	819	−21.1%
1961	879	+7.3%
1970	877	−0.2%

Year	Pop.	±%
1980	772	−12.0%
1991	756	−2.1%
2001	712	−5.8%
2011	687	−3.5%
2021	694	+1.0%

Source: Censuses

== Transport ==
The I/19 road (the section from Žďár nad Sázavou to Blansko District) runs through the market town.

== Sights ==
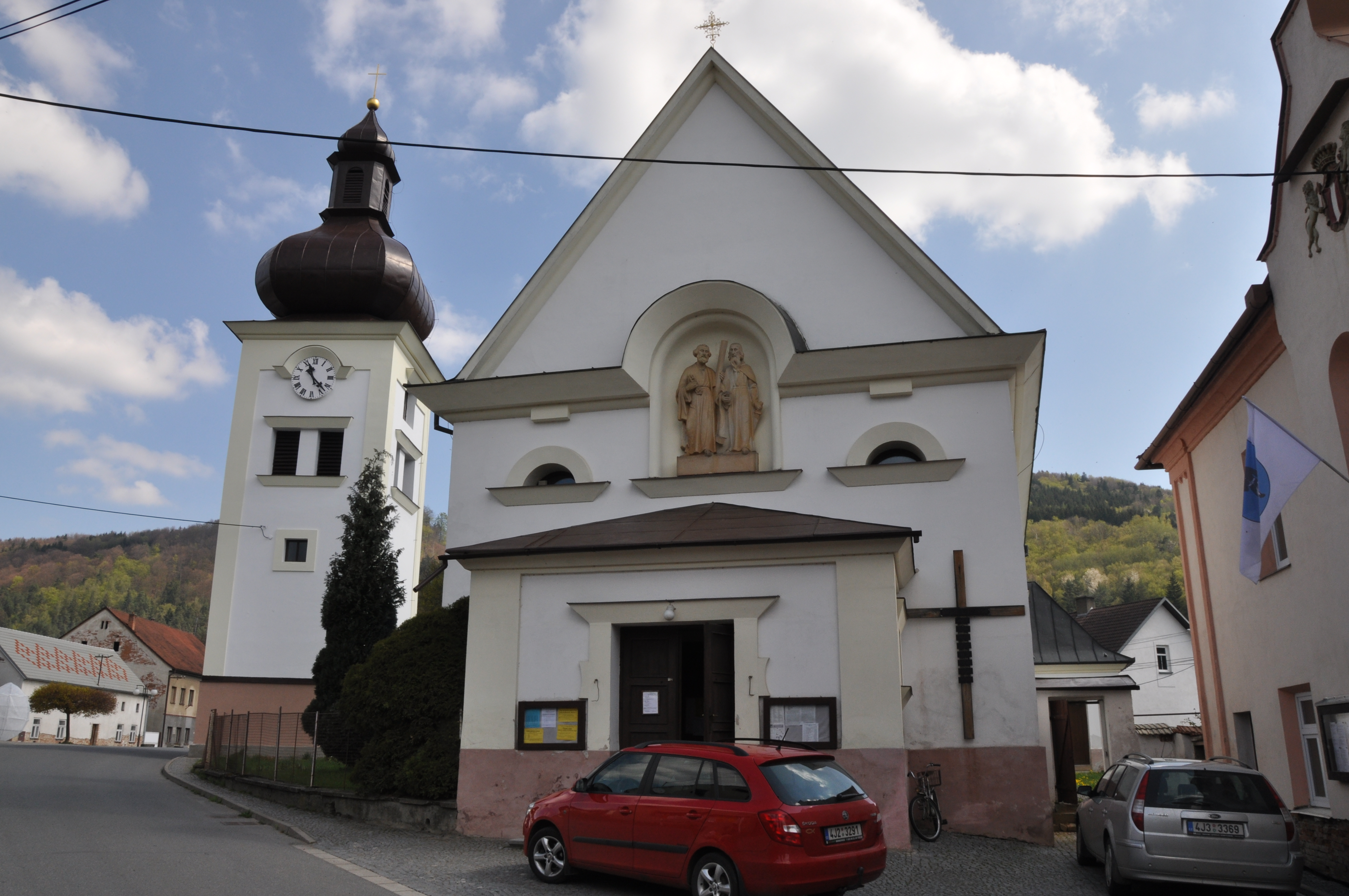
Church of Saints Peter and Paul

The main landmark of Štěpánov nad Svratkou is the Church of Saints Peter and Paul. The original medieval church from the second half of the 13th century was destroyed by a fire in 1917. The current church was built in the Cubist style in 1923–1924.

Among the protected cultural monuments in the municipality are an architecturally valuable rectory, a cast iron cross from 1761 and a Baroque statue of St. John of Nepomuk from 1896.
