= Ujčov =

- Municipality
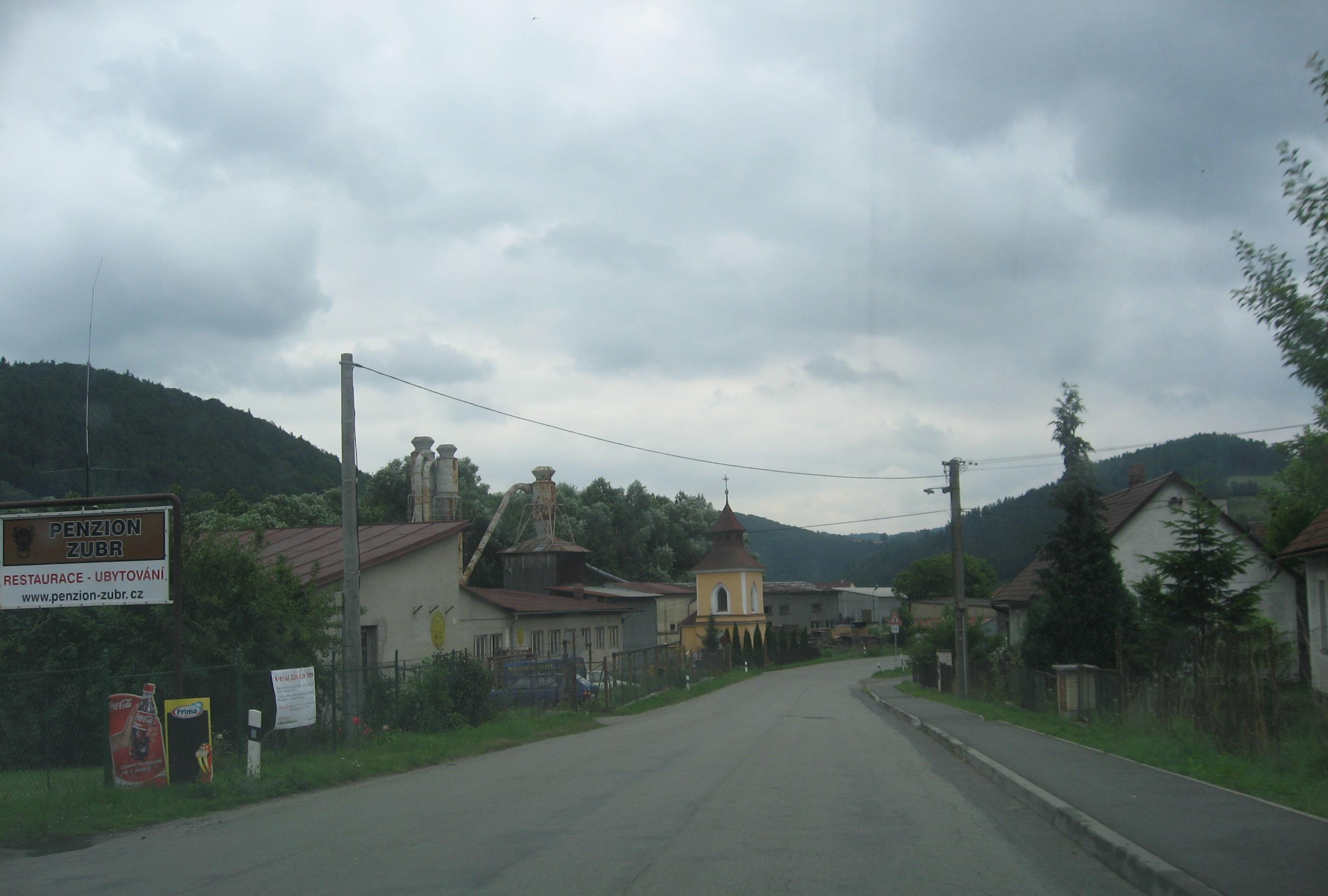
- Main road in Ujčov

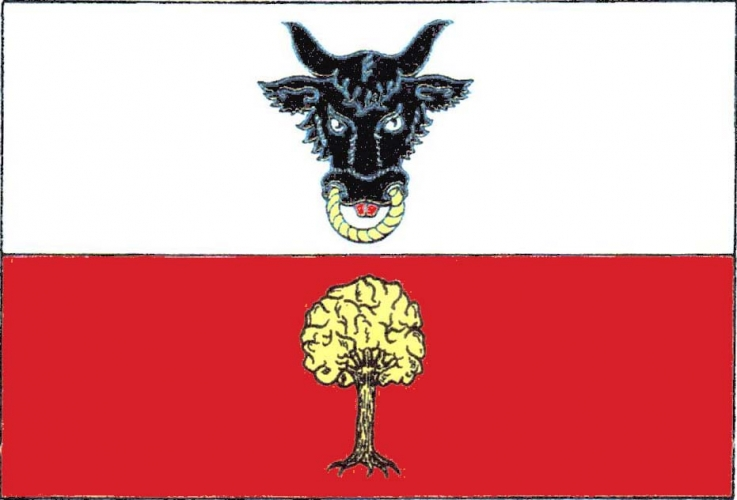
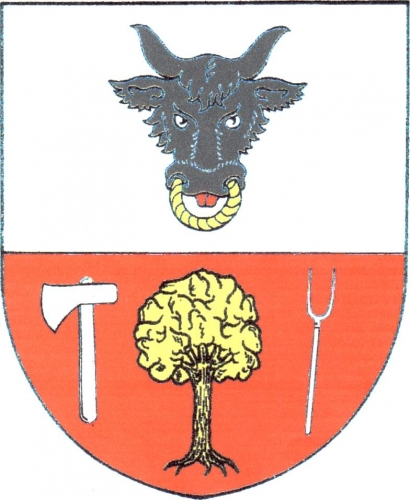
- Flag Coat of arms

- Location in the Czech Republic
- Coordinates: 49°29′18″N 16°19′52″E
- Country: Czech Republic
- Region: Vysočina
- District: Žďár nad Sázavou
- First mentioned: 1360

Area
  - Total: 11.99 km^{2} (4.63 sq mi)
- Elevation: 335 m (1,099 ft)

Population (2026-01-01)
  - Total: 468
  - Density: 39.0/km^{2} (101/sq mi)
- Time zone: UTC+1 (CET)
  - Summer (DST): UTC+2 (CEST)
- Postal code: 592 62
- Website: www.ujcov.cz

Ujčov is a municipality and village in Žďár nad Sázavou District in the Vysočina Region of the Czech Republic. It has about 500 inhabitants.

== Administrative division ==
Ujčov consists of five municipal parts (in brackets population according to the 2021 census):

- Ujčov (229)
- Dolní Čepí (80)
- Horní Čepí (11)
- Kovářová (39)
- Lískovec (105)

== Geography ==
Ujčov is located about 29 kilometres (18 mi) east of Žďár nad Sázavou and 35 km (22 mi) northwest of Brno. It lies in the Upper Svratka Highlands. The highest point is the hill Babylon at 626 m (2,054 ft) above sea level. The Svratka River flows through the municipality.

There are three protected areas in the municipal territory: Ochoza Nature Reserve (rocky ridge with the occurrence of crevice vegetation of silicate rocks), Křižník Nature Monument (beech forests and dry grasslands on limestone bedrock with the occurrence of many protected species of organisms, especially orchids) and Svratka Nature Monument (a section of the Svratka River with the occurrence of the ostrich fern, endangered in the Czech Republic).

== History ==
The first written mention of Ujčov and Čepí is from 1360, when they were a free enclave inside the Pernštejn estate. However, for most of their history, they were was connected with the Pernštejn estate.

== Demographics ==
Historical population

Year	Pop.	±%
1869	722	—
1880	727	+0.7%
1890	785	+8.0%
1900	690	−12.1%
1910	768	+11.3%

Year	Pop.	±%
1921	772	+0.5%
1930	752	−2.6%
1950	629	−16.4%
1961	658	+4.6%
1970	584	−11.2%

Year	Pop.	±%
1980	523	−10.4%
1991	511	−2.3%
2001	488	−4.5%
2011	487	−0.2%
2021	464	−4.7%

Source: Censuses

== Transport ==
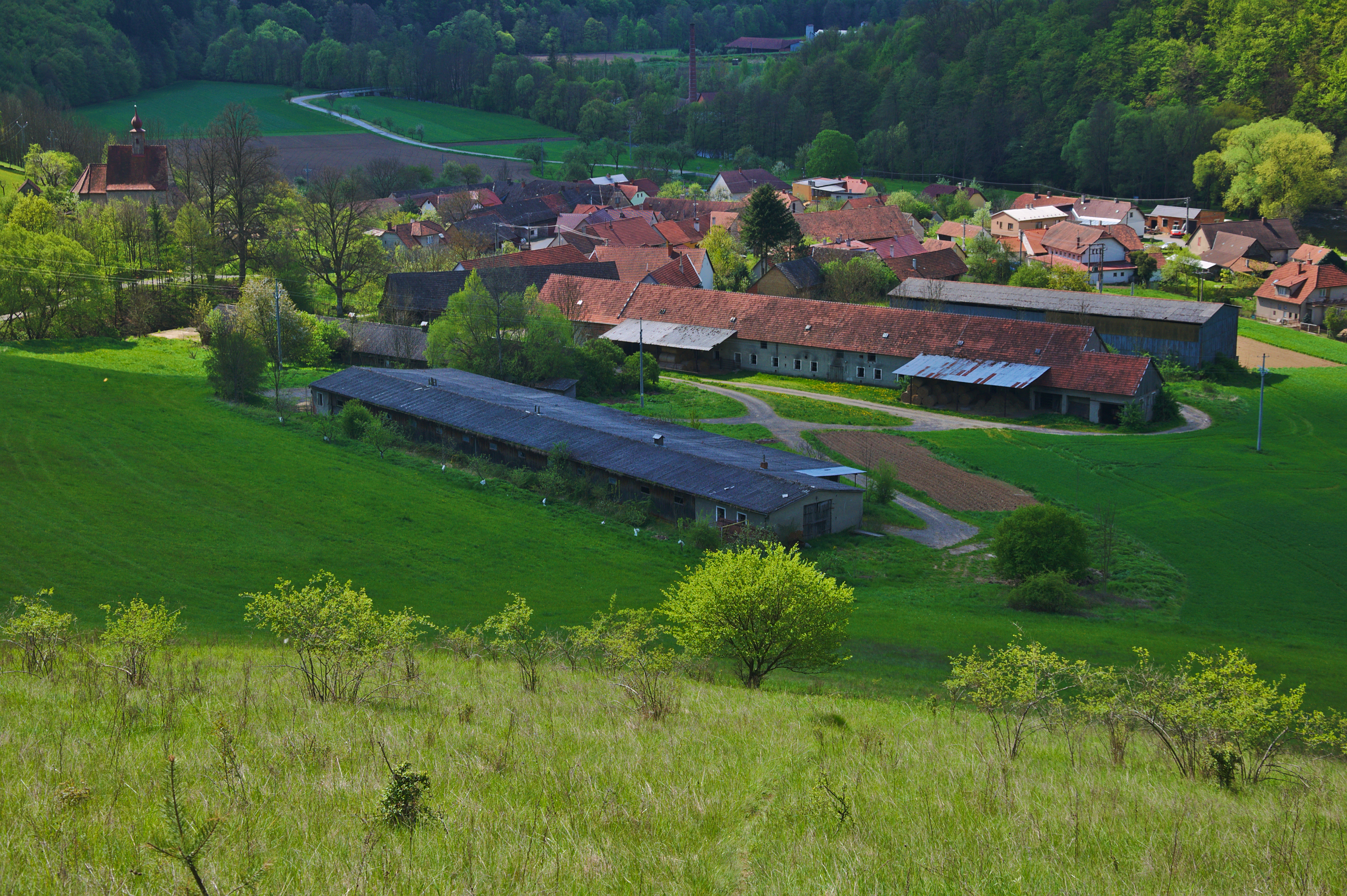
Dolní Čepí with the church on the left

There are no railways or major roads passing through the municipality.

== Sights ==
The main landmark of the municipality is the Church of Saint Wenceslaus, located in Dolní Čepí. It is a late Romanesque church with later modifications. Built in the early 13th century, it is among the oldest sacral buildings in the region.
