= Nosislav =

- Market town
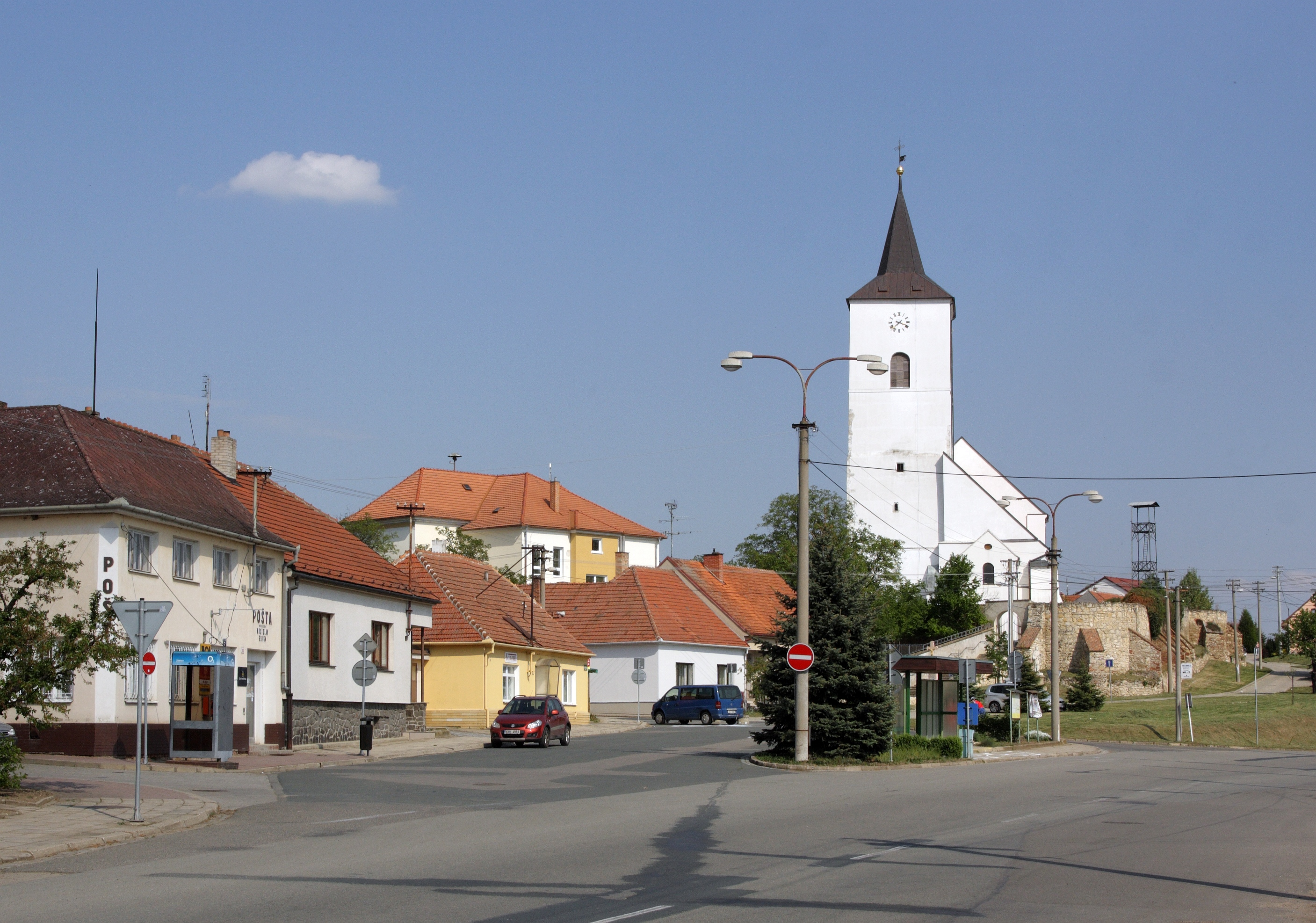
- Church of Saint James the Great

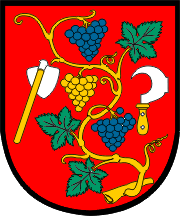
- Flag Coat of arms

- Location in the Czech Republic
- Coordinates: 49°0′50″N 16°39′16″E
- Country: Czech Republic
- Region: South Moravian
- District: Brno-Country
- First mentioned: 1278

Area
  - Total: 17.06 km^{2} (6.59 sq mi)
- Elevation: 186 m (610 ft)

Population (2026-01-01)
  - Total: 1,375
  - Density: 80.60/km^{2} (208.7/sq mi)
- Time zone: UTC+1 (CET)
  - Summer (DST): UTC+2 (CEST)
- Postal code: 691 64
- Website: www.nosislav.cz

Nosislav (Czech pronunciation: [ˈnosɪslaf]) is a market town in Brno-Country District in the South Moravian Region of the Czech Republic. It has about 1,400 inhabitants.

== Etymology ==
The name is derived from the personal name Nosislav. It was probably someone who once owned the settlement.

== Geography ==
Nosislav is located about 20 kilometres (12 mi) south of Brno. It lies in the Dyje–Svratka Valley. The highest point, located on the slopes of the Výhon hill, is at 345 m (1,132 ft) above sea level. The market town is situated in the valley of the Svratka River.

== History ==
The first written mention of Nosislav is from 1278. In 1406, the first vineyard was documented. Nosislav was promoted to a market town in 1486 by Matthias Corvinus. The peak of development was in the 16th century, when there was a mill, a brewery and wine cellars. The development was stopped by the Thirty Years' War. In 1643 and 1828, Nosislav was hit by extensive fires.

== Demographics ==
Historical population

Year	Pop.	±%
1869	1,270	—
1880	1,357	+6.9%
1890	1,374	+1.3%
1900	1,453	+5.7%
1910	1,462	+0.6%

Year	Pop.	±%
1921	1,414	−3.3%
1930	1,464	+3.5%
1950	1,319	−9.9%
1961	1,484	+12.5%
1970	1,435	−3.3%

Year	Pop.	±%
1980	1,333	−7.1%
1991	1,185	−11.1%
2001	1,243	+4.9%
2011	1,259	+1.3%
2021	1,306	+3.7%

Source: Censuses

== Transport ==
The D2 motorway (part of the European route E65) from Brno to Břeclav and further to Bratislava runs through the eastern part of the municipal territory.

== Sights ==
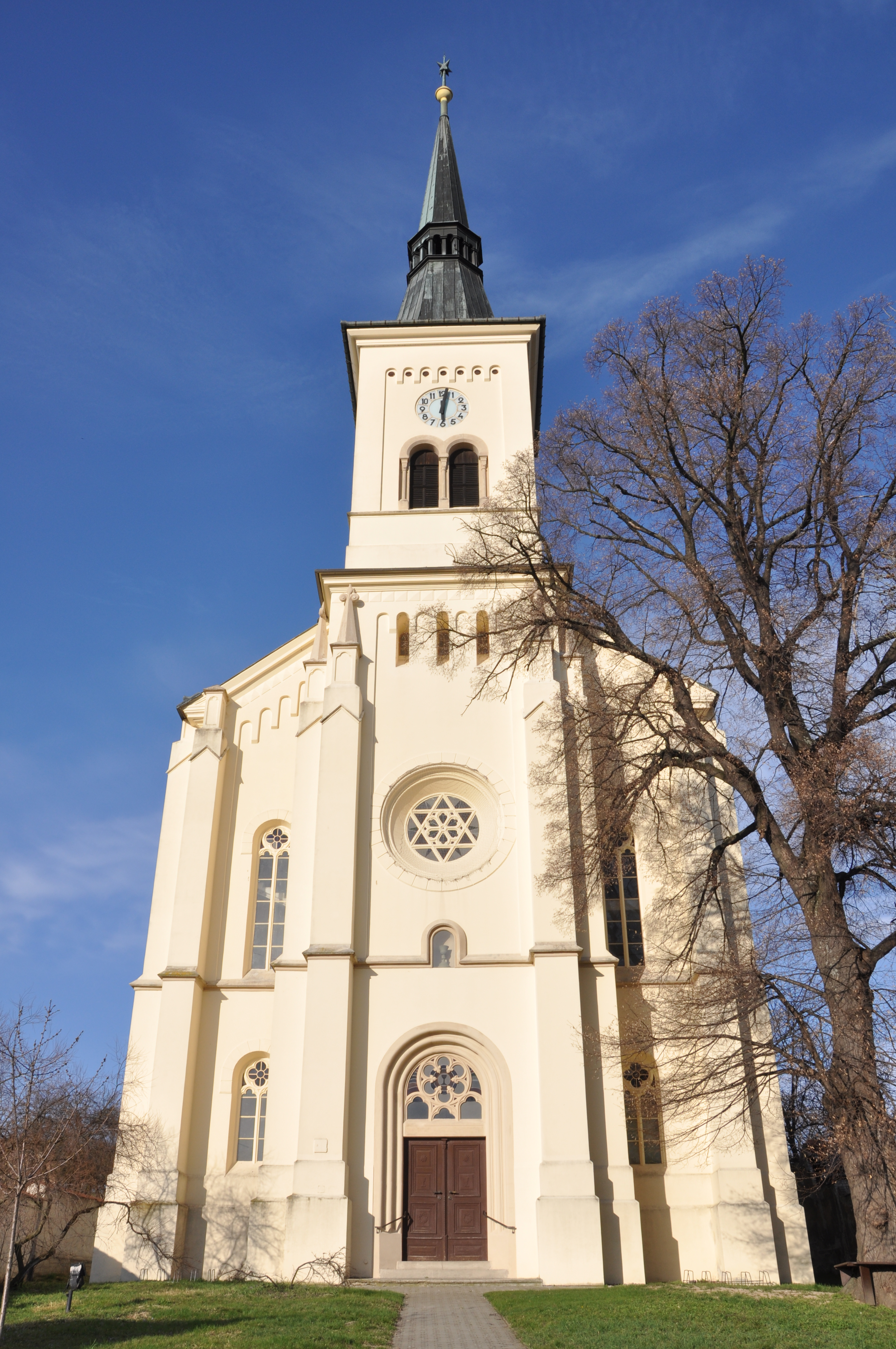
Protestant church

The most important monument is the Church of Saint James the Great. It is a late Gothic building with an older core. It was built around 1300 and fortified in the 15th century. After it burned down in 1643, it was reconstructed and extended in 1667. The church is one of the few surviving examples of sacral fortification architecture in the South Moravian Region.

The Protestant church was built in the style of the Romantic historism in 1872–1876. It is used by Evangelical Church of Czech Brethren.
