= Koroužné =

- Municipality
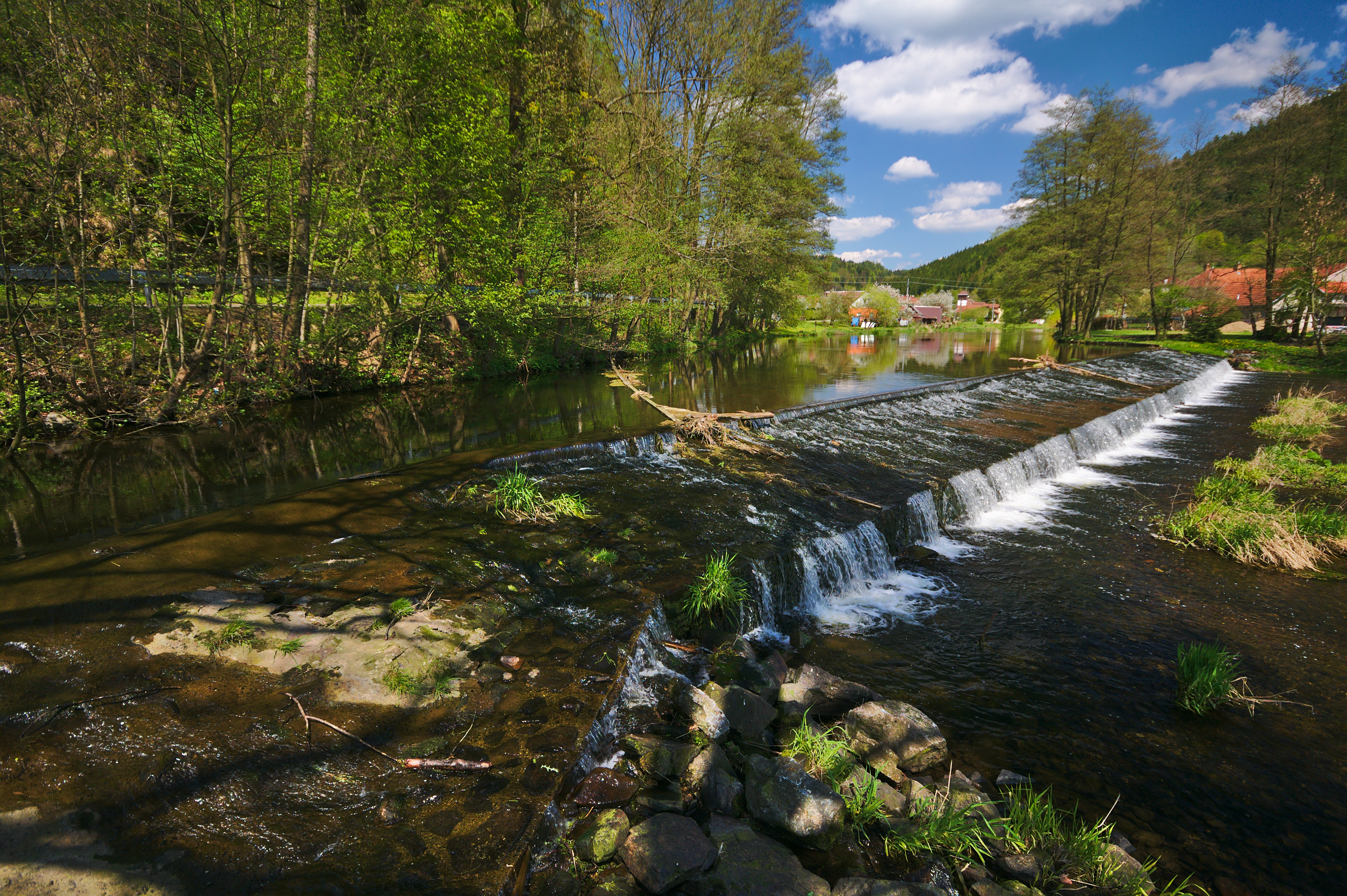
- Svratka River in Koroužné

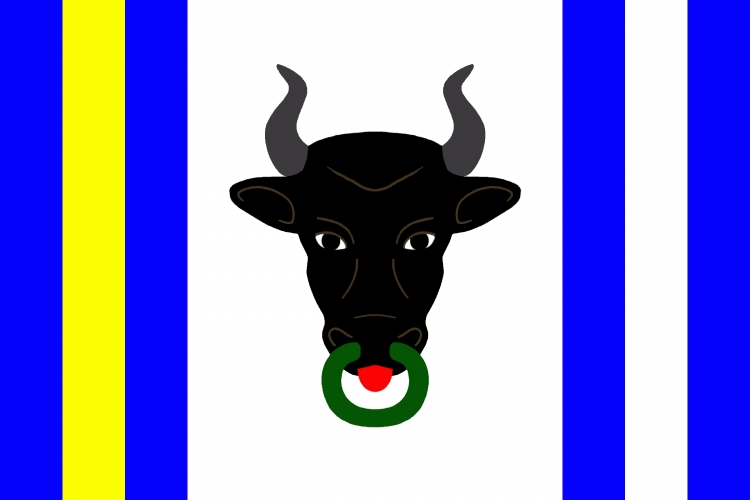
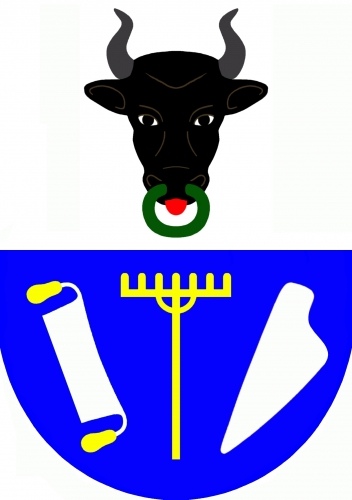
- Flag Coat of arms

- Location in the Czech Republic
- Coordinates: 49°31′39″N 16°20′52″E
- Country: Czech Republic
- Region: Vysočina
- District: Žďár nad Sázavou
- First mentioned: 1377

Area
  - Total: 6.26 km^{2} (2.42 sq mi)
- Elevation: 360 m (1,180 ft)

Population (2026-01-01)
  - Total: 247
  - Density: 39.5/km^{2} (102/sq mi)
- Time zone: UTC+1 (CET)
  - Summer (DST): UTC+2 (CEST)
- Postal code: 593 01
- Website: www.korouzne.cz

Koroužné is a municipality and village in Žďár nad Sázavou District in the Vysočina Region of the Czech Republic. It has about 200 inhabitants.

Koroužné lies approximately 30 kilometres (19 mi) east of Žďár nad Sázavou, 57 km (35 mi) east of Jihlava, and 152 km (94 mi) south-east of Prague.

== Administrative division ==
Koroužné consists of three municipal parts (in brackets population according to the 2021 census):

- Koroužné (171)
- Kobylnice (31)
- Švařec (51)

== Demographics ==
Historical population
Year	Pop.	±%
1869	540	—
1880	537	−0.6%
1890	510	−5.0%
1900	575	+12.7%
1910	563	−2.1%
1921	532	−5.5%
1930	618	+16.2%
1950	444	−28.2%
1961	476	+7.2%
1970	422	−11.3%
1980	359	−14.9%
1991	296	−17.5%
2001	290	−2.0%
2011	257	−11.4%
2021	253	−1.6%
Source: Censuses
