= Vír =

- Municipality
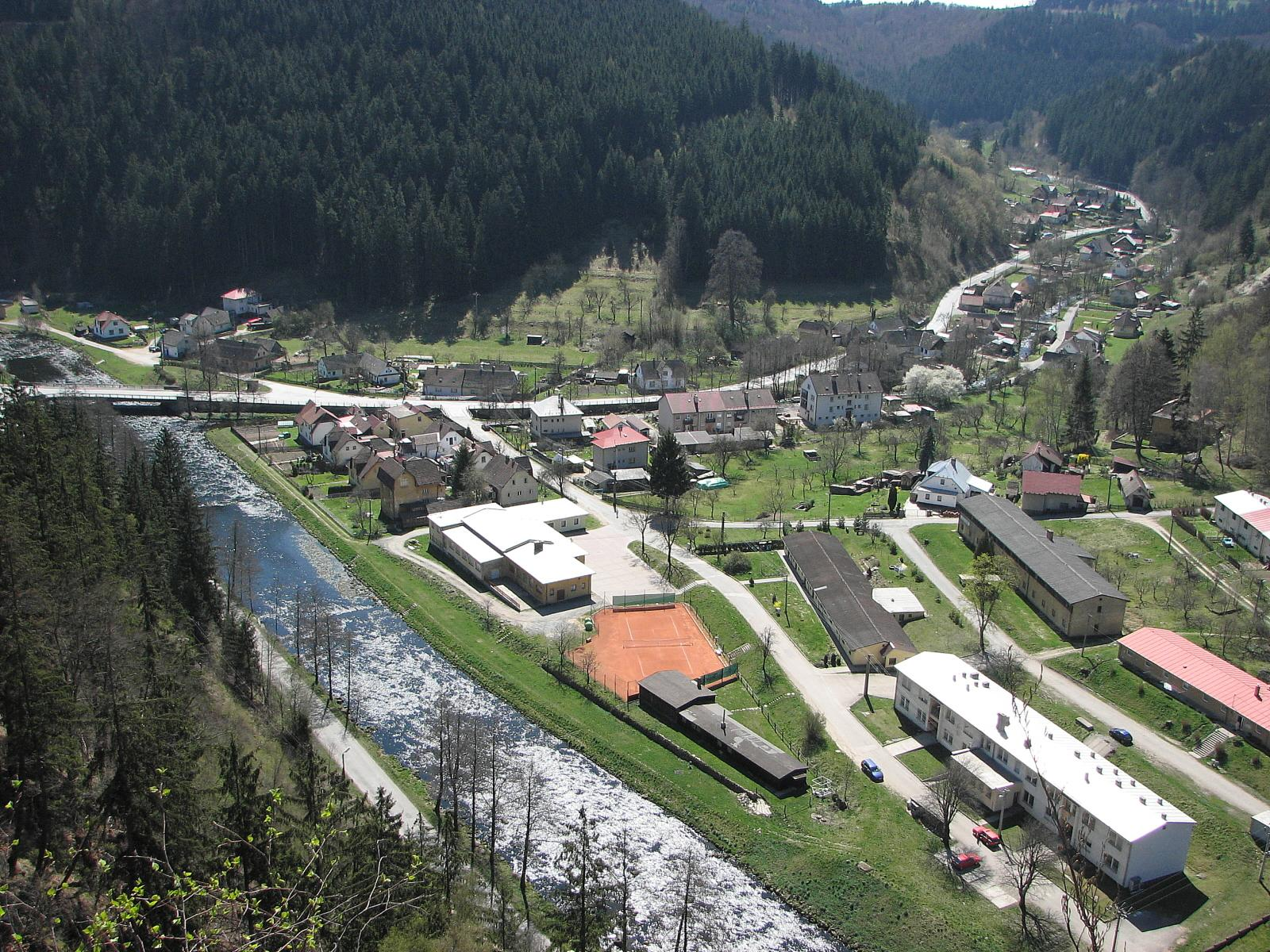
- Vír in the valley of the Svratka River

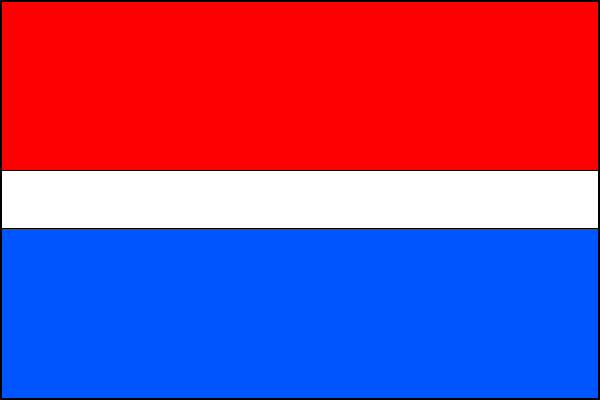
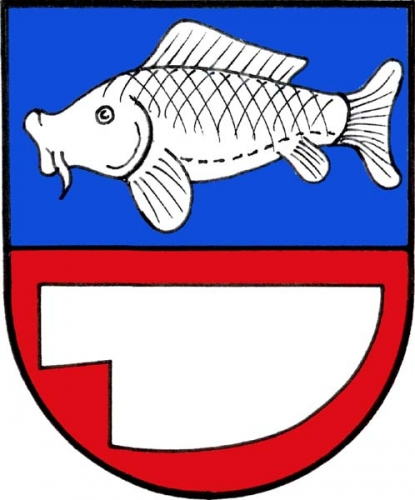
- Flag Coat of arms

- Location in the Czech Republic
- Coordinates: 49°33′27″N 16°19′25″E
- Country: Czech Republic
- Region: Vysočina
- District: Žďár nad Sázavou
- First mentioned: 1364

Area
  - Total: 5.33 km^{2} (2.06 sq mi)
- Elevation: 384 m (1,260 ft)

Population (2026-01-01)
  - Total: 643
  - Density: 121/km^{2} (312/sq mi)
- Time zone: UTC+1 (CET)
  - Summer (DST): UTC+2 (CEST)
- Postal code: 592 66
- Website: www.virvudolisvratky.cz

Vír (German: Wühr) is a municipality and village in Žďár nad Sázavou District in the Vysočina Region of the Czech Republic. It has about 600 inhabitants. It lies on the Svratka River.

Vír lies approximately 28 kilometres (17 mi) east of Žďár nad Sázavou, 56 kilometres (35 mi) east of Jihlava, and 149 kilometres (93 mi) south-east of Prague.

== Demographics ==
Historical population
Year	Pop.	±%
1869	528	—
1880	564	+6.8%
1890	514	−8.9%
1900	552	+7.4%
1910	611	+10.7%
1921	616	+0.8%
1930	717	+16.4%
1950	1,204	+67.9%
1961	1,059	−12.0%
1970	956	−9.7%
1980	853	−10.8%
1991	787	−7.7%
2001	759	−3.6%
2011	695	−8.4%
2021	671	−3.5%
Source: Censuses
