= Štěpánovice (Brno-Country District) =

- Municipality
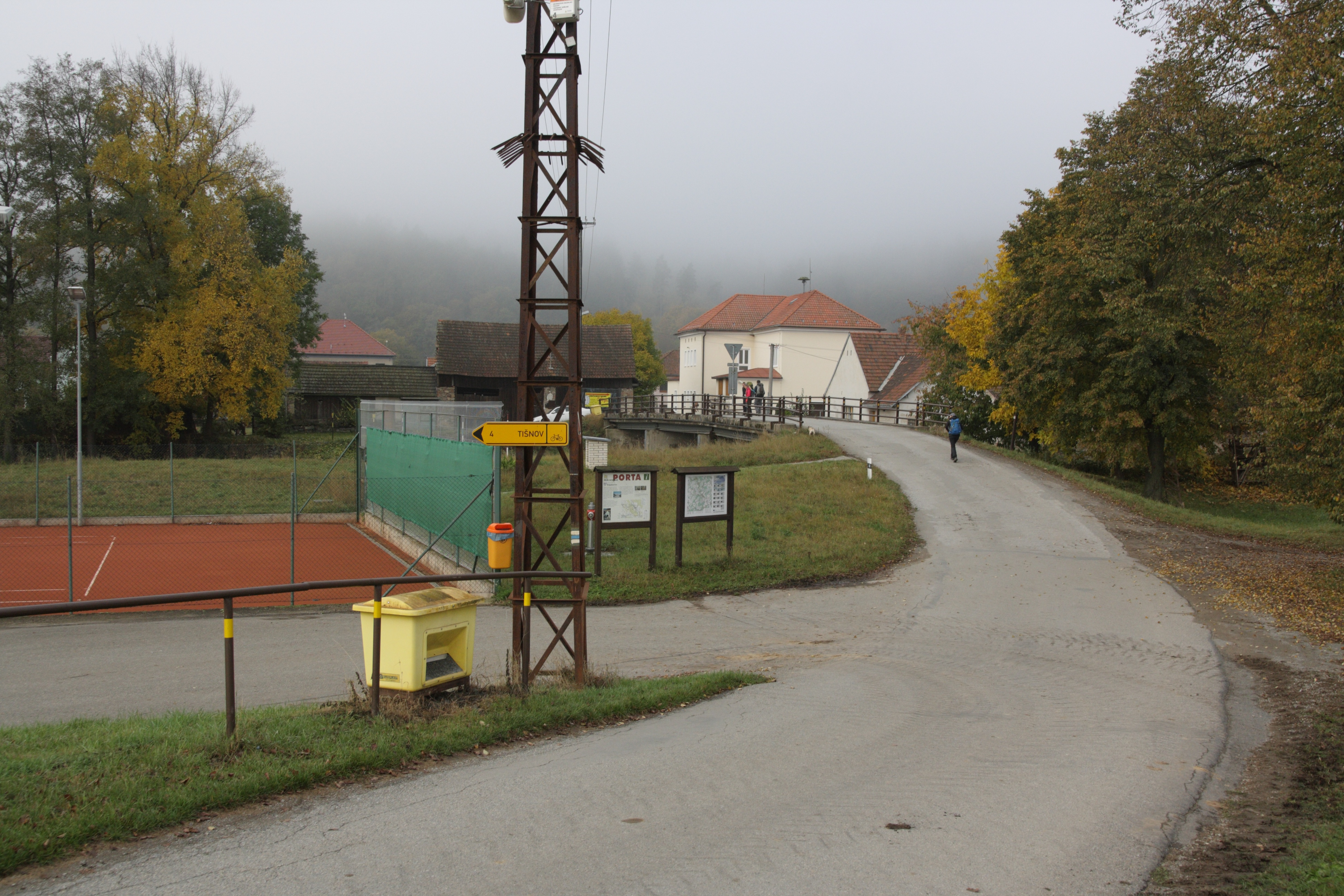
- Centre with a bridge over the Svratka River

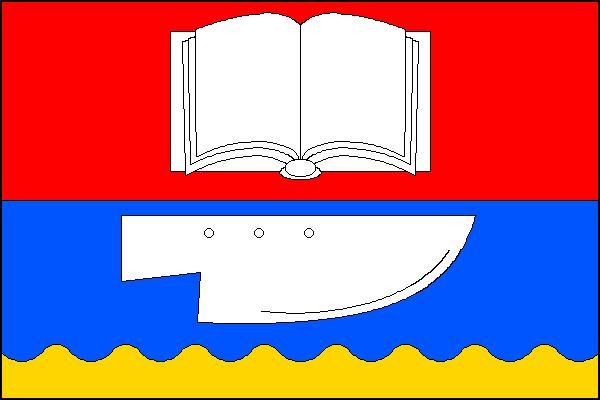
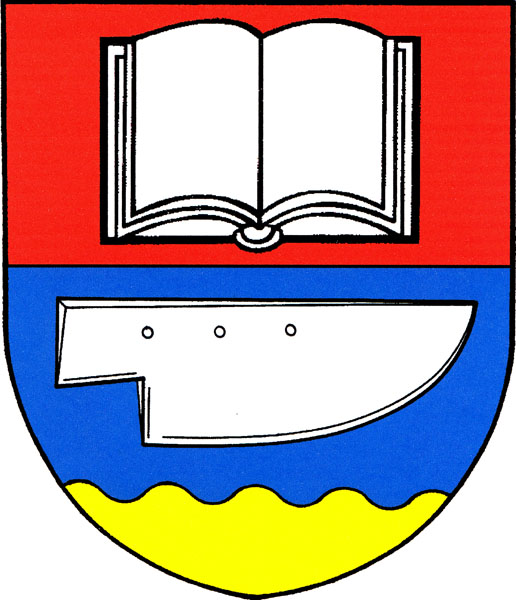
- Flag Coat of arms

- Location in the Czech Republic
- Coordinates: 49°22′23″N 16°23′15″E
- Country: Czech Republic
- Region: South Moravian
- District: Brno-Country
- First mentioned: 1589

Area
  - Total: 5.03 km^{2} (1.94 sq mi)
- Elevation: 261 m (856 ft)

Population (2026-01-01)
  - Total: 500
  - Density: 99/km^{2} (260/sq mi)
- Time zone: UTC+1 (CET)
  - Summer (DST): UTC+2 (CEST)
- Postal code: 666 02
- Website: www.stepanovice.cz

Štěpánovice is a municipality and village in Brno-Country District in the South Moravian Region of the Czech Republic. It has about 500 inhabitants. It lies on the Svratka River.

Štěpánovice lies approximately 26 kilometres (16 mi) north-west of Brno and 163 km (101 mi) south-east of Prague.

== Demographics ==
Historical population
Year	Pop.	±%
1869	353	—
1880	350	−0.8%
1890	321	−8.3%
1900	332	+3.4%
1910	313	−5.7%
1921	302	−3.5%
1930	343	+13.6%
1950	407	+18.7%
1961	409	+0.5%
1970	423	+3.4%
1980	432	+2.1%
1991	382	−11.6%
2001	413	+8.1%
2011	455	+10.2%
2021	495	+8.8%
Source: Censuses
