= Spělkov =

- Municipality
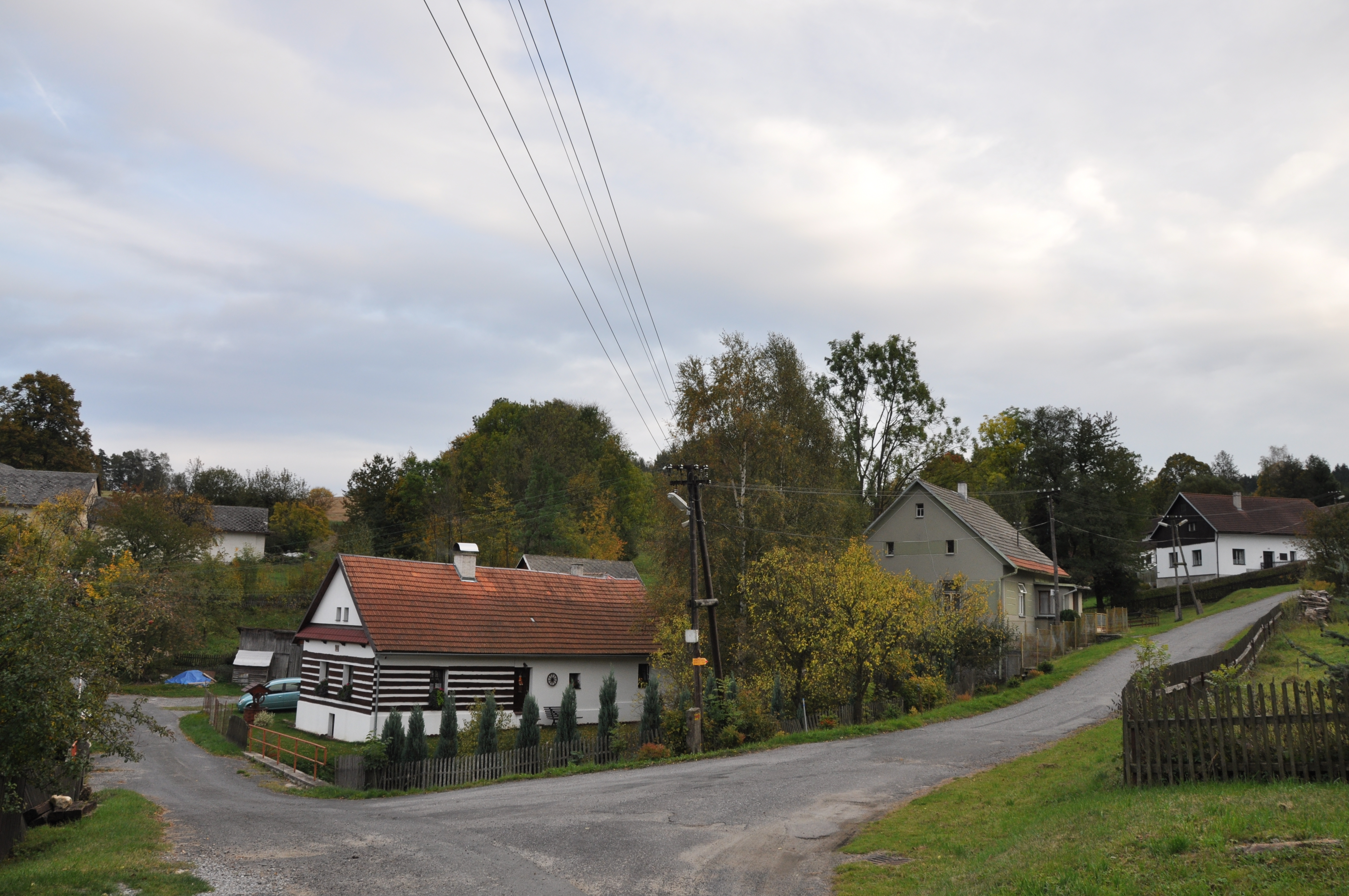
- Centre of Spělkov

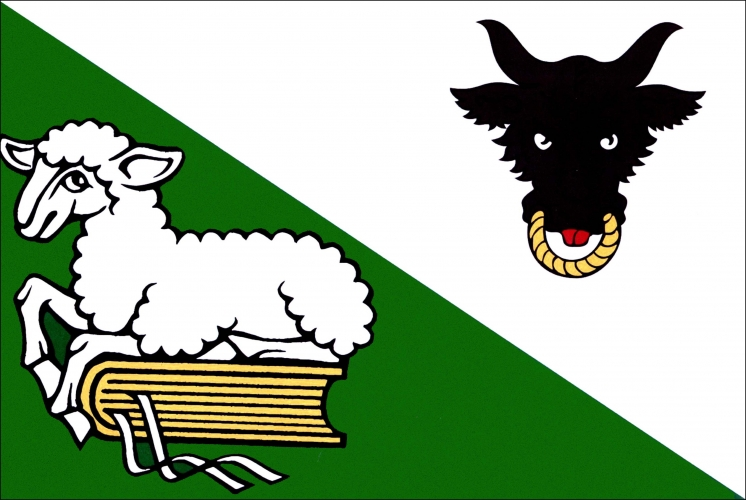
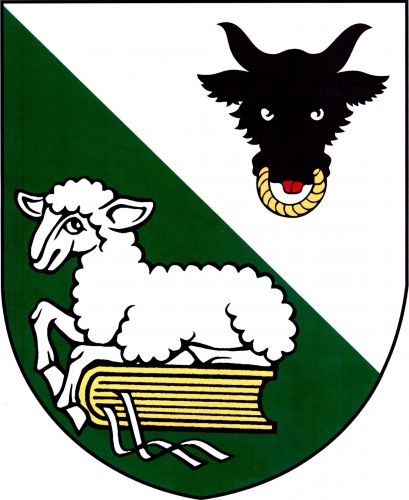
- Flag Coat of arms

- Location in the Czech Republic
- Coordinates: 49°40′29″N 16°9′40″E
- Country: Czech Republic
- Region: Vysočina
- District: Žďár nad Sázavou
- First mentioned: 1392

Area
  - Total: 2.58 km^{2} (1.00 sq mi)
- Elevation: 610 m (2,000 ft)

Population (2026-01-01)
  - Total: 35
  - Density: 14/km^{2} (35/sq mi)
- Time zone: UTC+1 (CET)
  - Summer (DST): UTC+2 (CEST)
- Postal code: 592 03
- Website: www.spelkov.cz

Spělkov is a municipality and village in Žďár nad Sázavou District in the Vysočina Region of the Czech Republic. It has about 40 inhabitants.

Spělkov lies approximately 20 kilometres (12 mi) north-east of Žďár nad Sázavou, 52 km (32 mi) north-east of Jihlava, and 133 km (83 mi) east of Prague.

== Demographics ==
Historical population
Year	Pop.	±%
1869	252	—
1880	241	−4.4%
1890	233	−3.3%
1900	243	+4.3%
1910	222	−8.6%
1921	226	+1.8%
1930	206	−8.8%
1950	128	−37.9%
1961	130	+1.6%
1970	104	−20.0%
1980	80	−23.1%
1991	68	−15.0%
2001	58	−14.7%
2011	41	−29.3%
2021	26	−36.6%
Source: Censuses
