= Unčín =

- Municipality
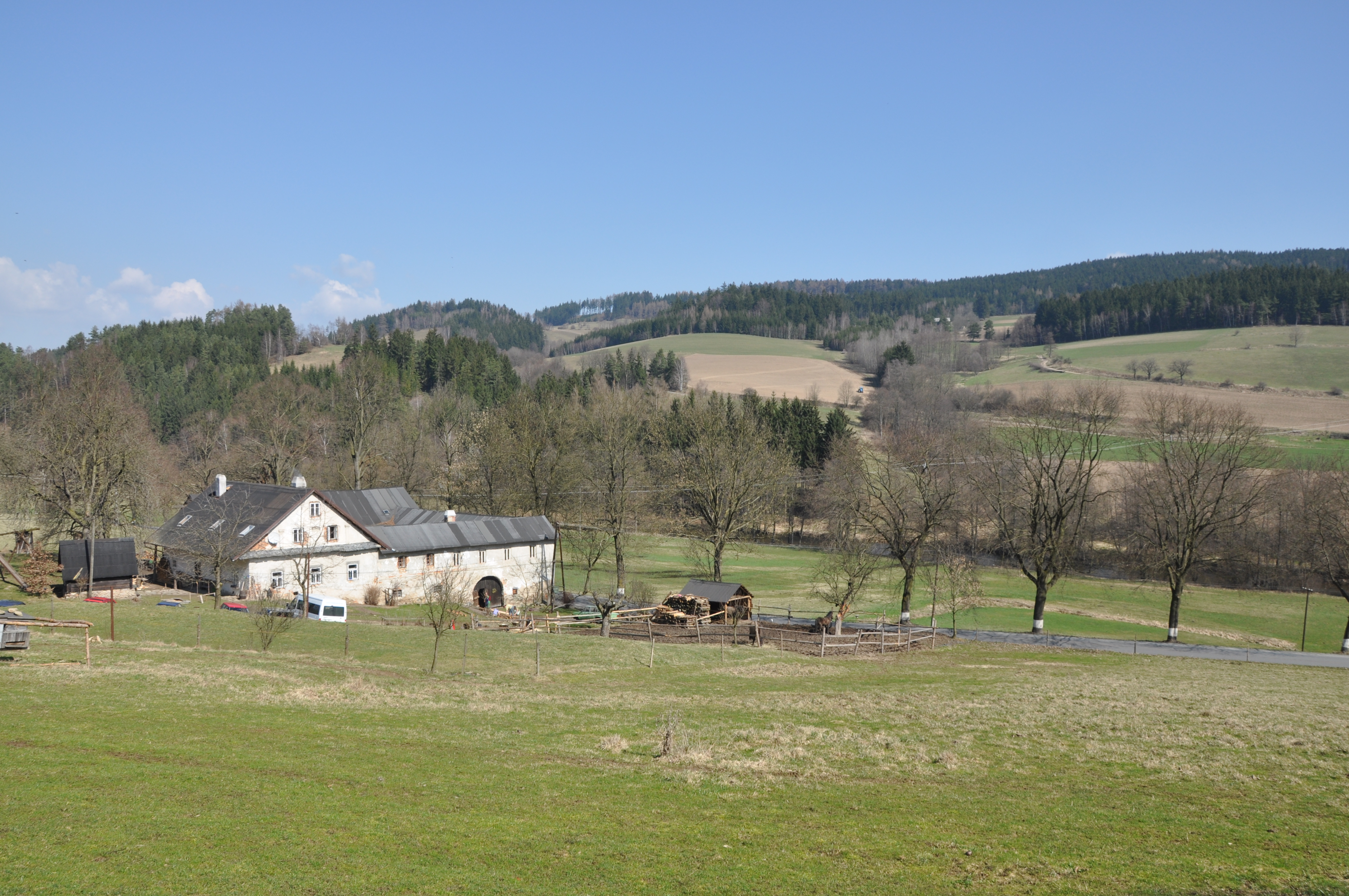
- A locality of Unčín called Zbytov

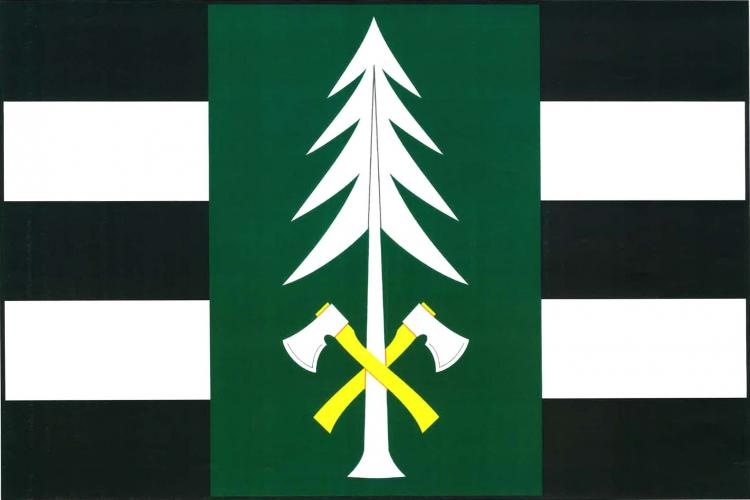
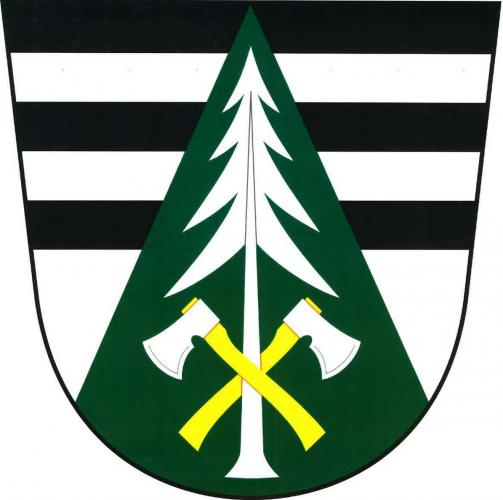
- Flag Coat of arms

- Location in the Czech Republic
- Coordinates: 49°36′28″N 16°14′45″E
- Country: Czech Republic
- Region: Vysočina
- District: Žďár nad Sázavou
- First mentioned: 1379

Area
  - Total: 3.83 km^{2} (1.48 sq mi)
- Elevation: 480 m (1,570 ft)

Population (2026-01-01)
  - Total: 199
  - Density: 52.0/km^{2} (135/sq mi)
- Time zone: UTC+1 (CET)
  - Summer (DST): UTC+2 (CEST)
- Postal code: 592 42
- Website: www.obec-uncin.cz

Unčín is a municipality and village in Žďár nad Sázavou District in the Vysočina Region of the Czech Republic. It has about 200 inhabitants.

Unčín lies approximately 23 kilometres (14 mi) east of Žďár nad Sázavou, 53 km (33 mi) north-east of Jihlava, and 141 km (88 mi) east of Prague.

== Demographics ==
Historical population
Year	Pop.	±%
1869	282	—
1880	310	+9.9%
1890	285	−8.1%
1900	255	−10.5%
1910	282	+10.6%
1921	288	+2.1%
1930	255	−11.5%
1950	227	−11.0%
1961	232	+2.2%
1970	239	+3.0%
1980	202	−15.5%
1991	190	−5.9%
2001	191	+0.5%
2011	202	+5.8%
2021	188	−6.9%
Source: Censuses
