= Strachujov =

- Municipality
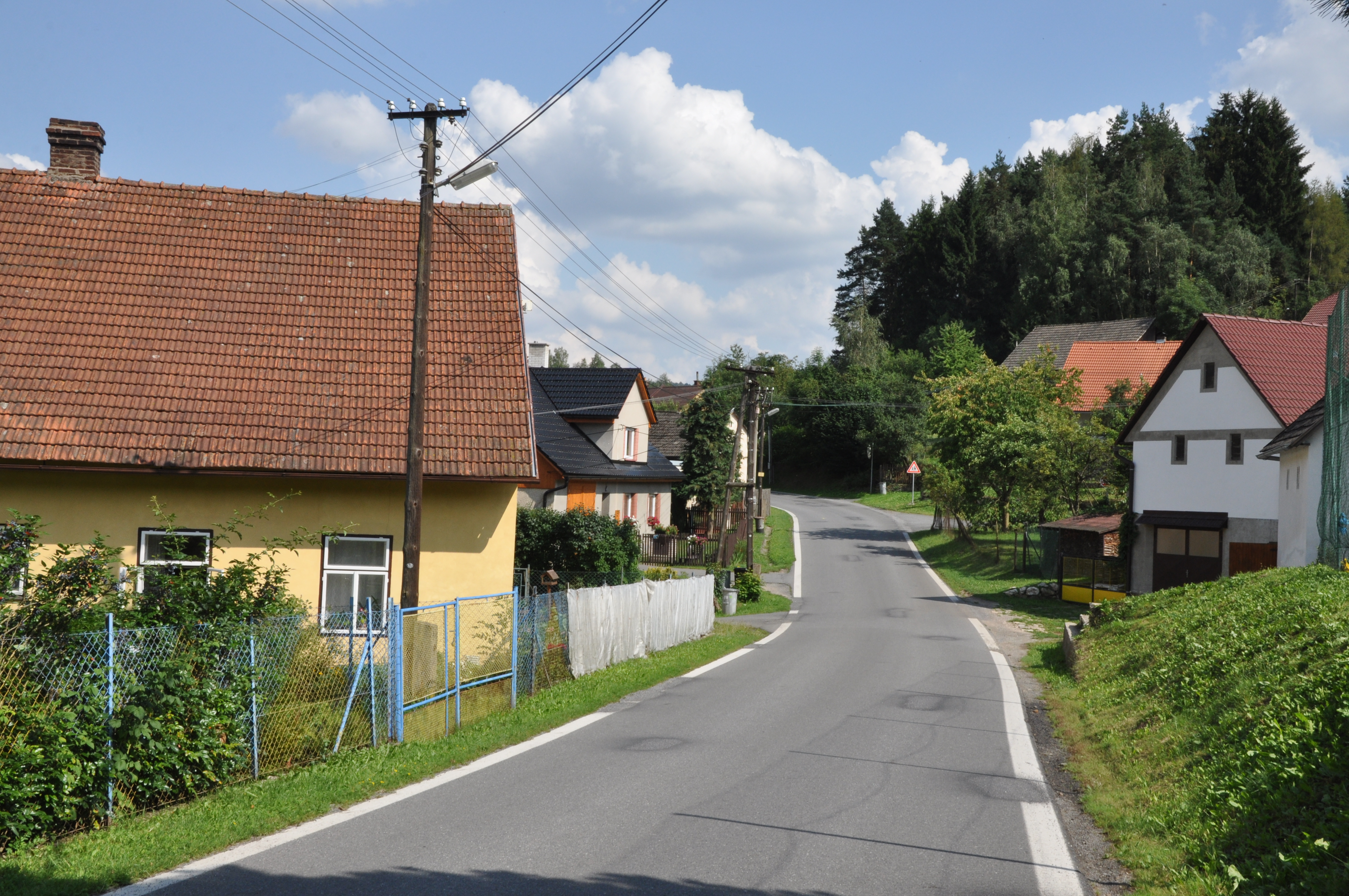
- Centre of Strachujov

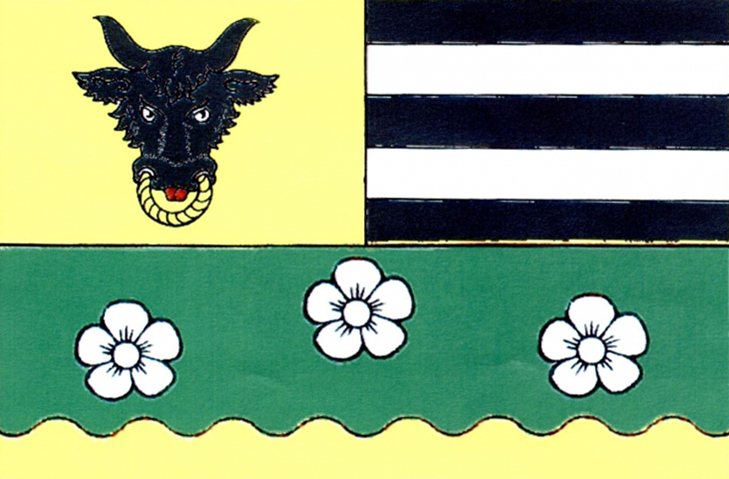
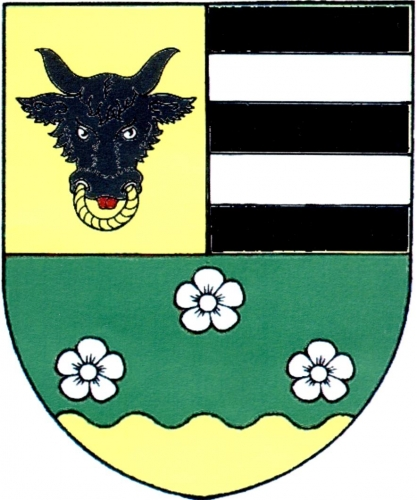
- Flag Coat of arms

- Location in the Czech Republic
- Coordinates: 49°36′47″N 16°13′36″E
- Country: Czech Republic
- Region: Vysočina
- District: Žďár nad Sázavou
- First mentioned: 1361

Area
  - Total: 2.89 km^{2} (1.12 sq mi)
- Elevation: 490 m (1,610 ft)

Population (2026-01-01)
  - Total: 128
  - Density: 44.3/km^{2} (115/sq mi)
- Time zone: UTC+1 (CET)
  - Summer (DST): UTC+2 (CEST)
- Postal code: 592 42
- Website: www.strachujov.cz

Strachujov is a municipality and village in Žďár nad Sázavou District in the Vysočina Region of the Czech Republic. It has about 100 inhabitants.

Strachujov lies approximately 22 kilometres (14 mi) east of Žďár nad Sázavou, 52 km (32 mi) north-east of Jihlava, and 140 km (87 mi) east of Prague.

== Demographics ==
Historical population
Year	Pop.	±%
1869	241	—
1880	263	+9.1%
1890	267	+1.5%
1900	271	+1.5%
1910	227	−16.2%
1921	238	+4.8%
1930	225	−5.5%
1950	160	−28.9%
1961	167	+4.4%
1970	142	−15.0%
1980	145	+2.1%
1991	142	−2.1%
2001	154	+8.5%
2011	141	−8.4%
2021	122	−13.5%
Source: Censuses
