= Žďárské vrchy =

Mountain range in the Czech Republic

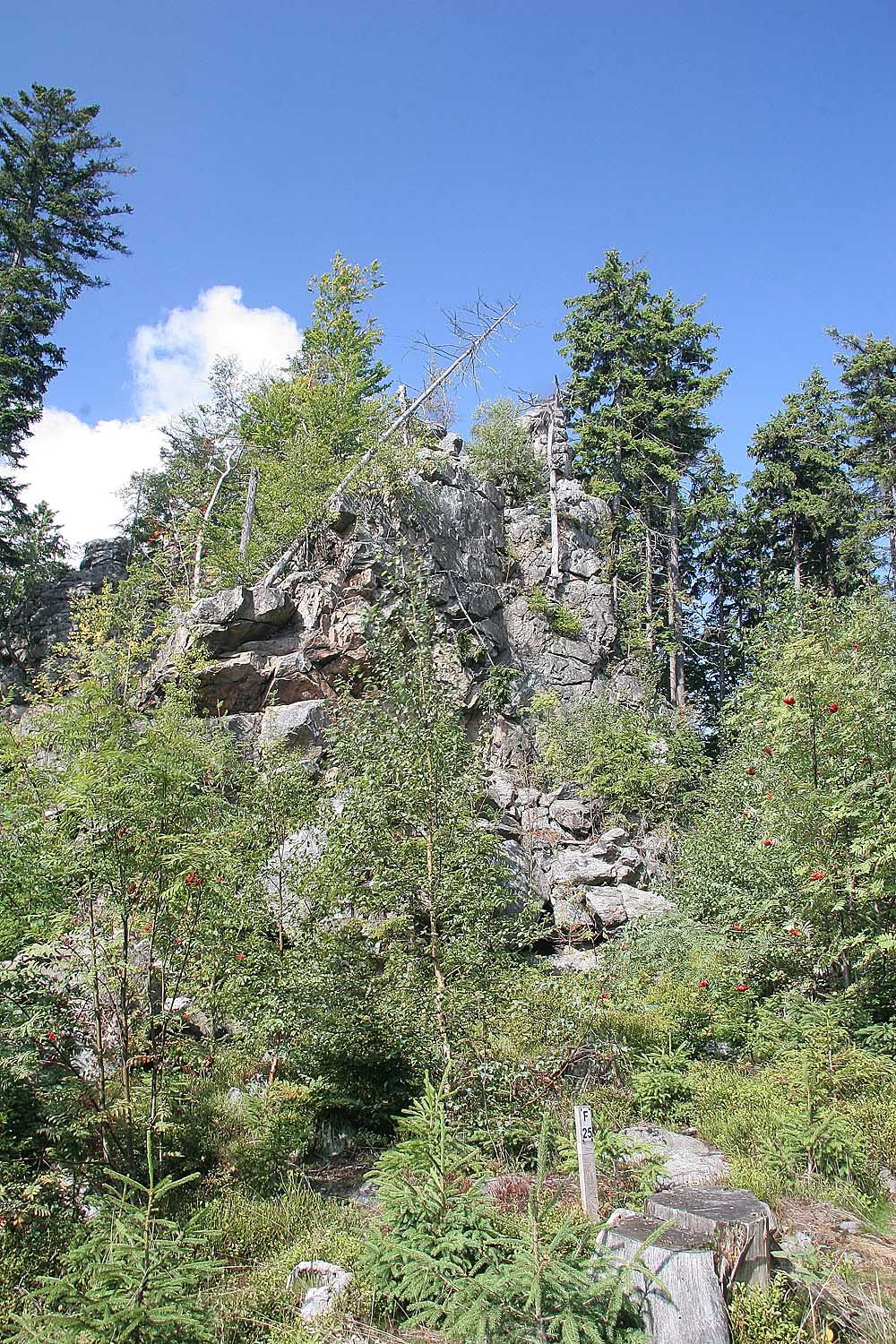

Highest point
- Peak: Devět skal
- Elevation: 836 m (2,743 ft)

Dimensions
- Area: 485.78 sq km

Geography
- Location within Czech Republic
- Country: Czech Republic
- Range coordinates: 49°40′14″N 16°01′56″E
- Parent range: Bohemian Massif

Žďárské vrchy (German: Saarer Bergland) is a mountain range in the Czech Republic. It is located in the northwest part of Upper Svratka Highlands which is part of Bohemian-Moravian Highlands and has an area of 485.78 km^{2}. The highest peak of Žďárké vrchy is Devět skal (836 m). Other significant peaks are Křovina (829,7 m), Křivý javor (823,5 m), Kopeček (821,7 m) or Pasecká skála (818,6 m).

Žďárské vrchy is a source of the Sázava and Svratka rivers.

The forest cover comprises mostly spruces, mixed by beeches, firs, larches and pines.
