= Upper Svratka Highlands =

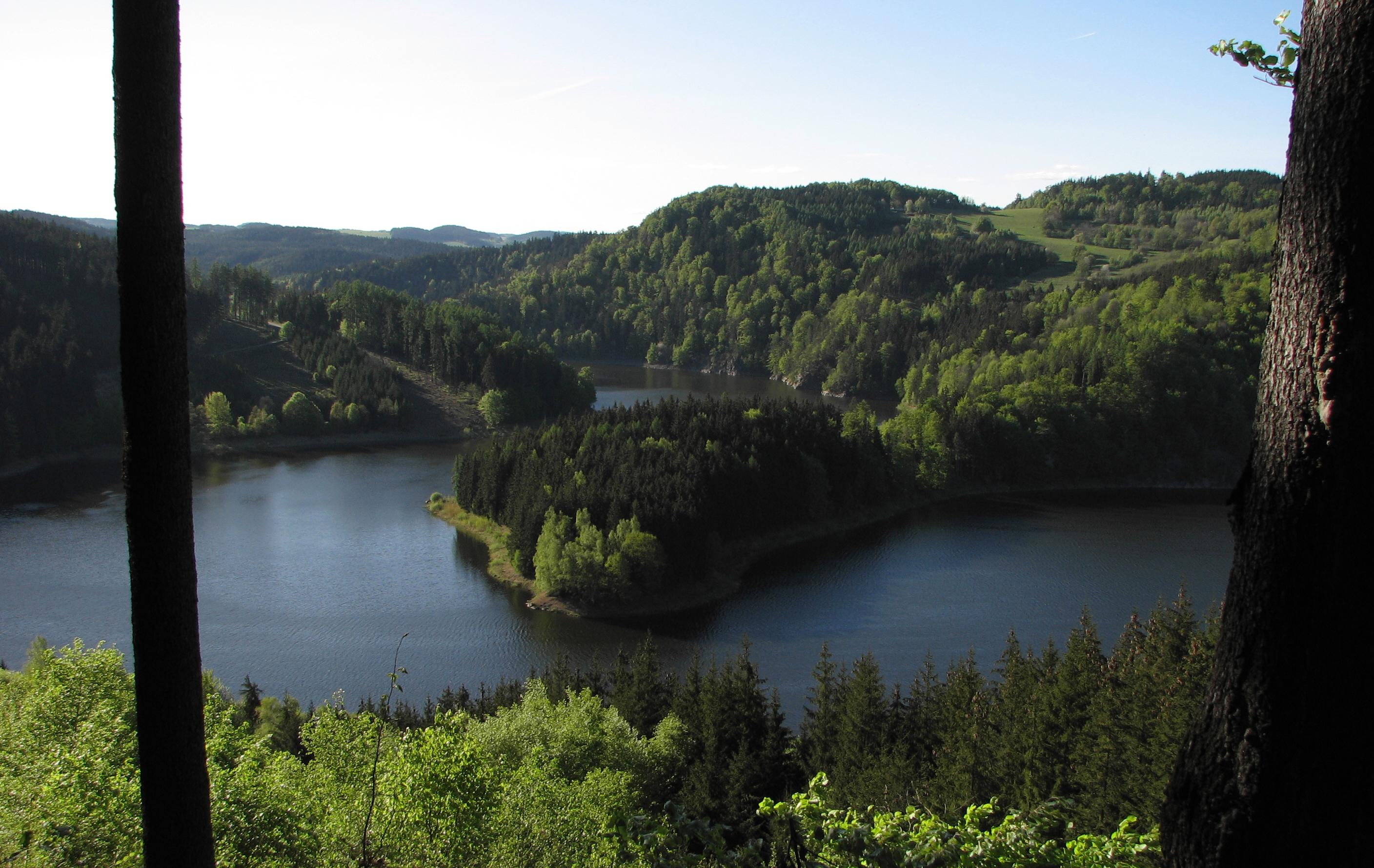
- View of the Vír Reservoir

Highest point
- Peak: Devět skal
- Elevation: 836 m (2,743 ft)

Dimensions
- Length: 53 km (33 mi)
- Area: 1,135 km^{2} (438 mi^{2})

Geography
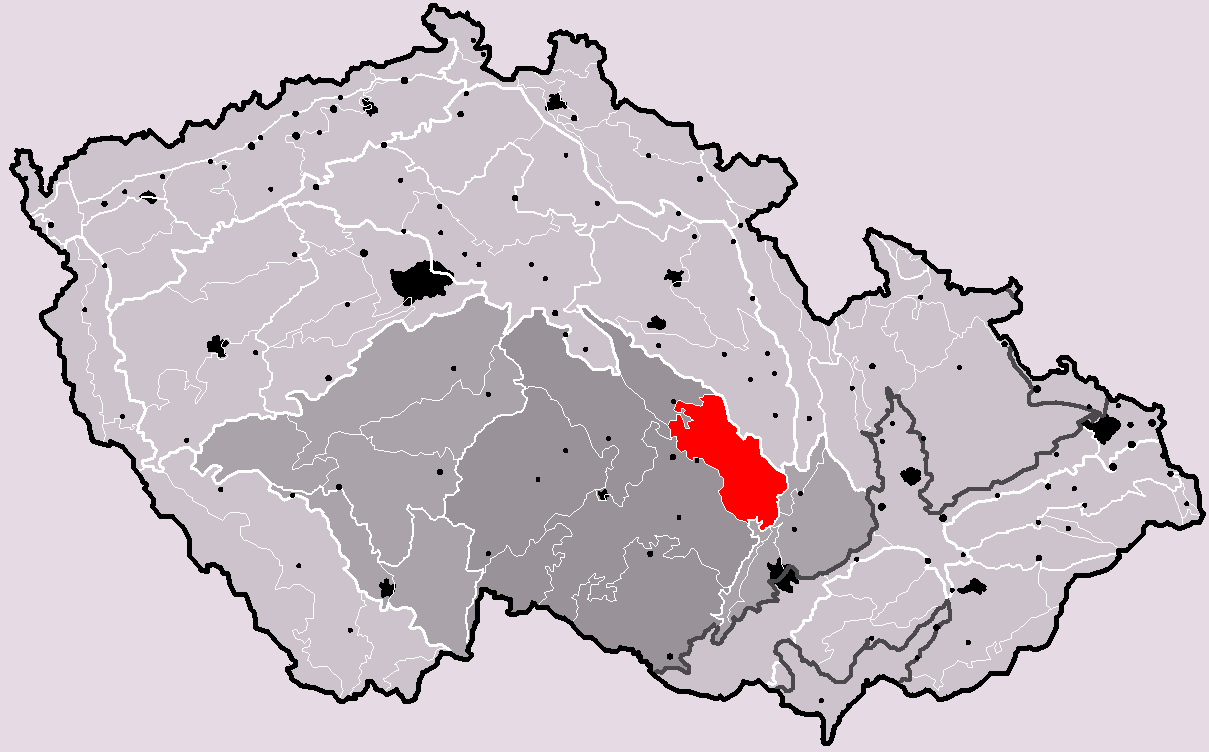
- Upper Svratka Highlands in the geomorphological system of the Czech Republic
- Country: Czech Republic
- Regions: Vysočina, South Moravian, Pardubice
- Range coordinates: 49°35′N 16°18′E
- Parent range: Bohemian-Moravian Highlands

Geology
- Rock type(s): Granite, quartz, slate

The Upper Svratka Highlands (Czech: Hornosvratecká vrchovina) is a mountain range in Moravia, Czech Republic. The Highlands, together with the Křižanov Highlands threshold, form the Western-Moravian part of Moldanubian Zone – east south part of Bohemian Massif.

== Geography ==
The Upper Svratka Highlands rise to the north of the Tišnov between Lomnice, and the Svratka in the north. The highlands have an area of 1,135 square kilometres (438 sq mi) and an average height of 580 metres (1,900 ft). The highest peak is Devět skal at 836 metres (2,743 ft); other peaks are Žákova hora 810 metres (2,660 ft) Pohledecká skála 800 metres (2,600 ft), Horní les 774 metres (2,539 ft), Harusův kopec 741 metres (2,431 ft), Přední skála 712 metres (2,336 ft), or Sýkoř 702 metres (2,303 ft).

The northwestern part is formed by Žďárské vrchy mountain range. To the southeast is the Boskovice Furrow and in the east the Svitavy Uplands. The Svratka river stream naturally established Bohemian-Moravian border, the other part of Elbe–Danube main European watershed

The mountain range is 63% forested, though mainly by plantations – spruces, maples, beeches, elmeses. The forests are in well condition.

The primary composition of the range is cretaceous granite, migmatite, orthogneiss, amphibole, granodiorite, gabbro and quartz slate. Often gneis. Soil horizon – mainly cambisol.

The rivers Svratka, Bobrůvka and Novohradka originate here.

== Population ==
The area is relatively sparsely populated (in terms of the Czech Republic). The largest towns in the Upper Svratka Highlands are Nové Město na Moravě (partly), Bystřice nad Pernštejnem, Kunštát, Olešnice and Bystré.

== Gallery ==
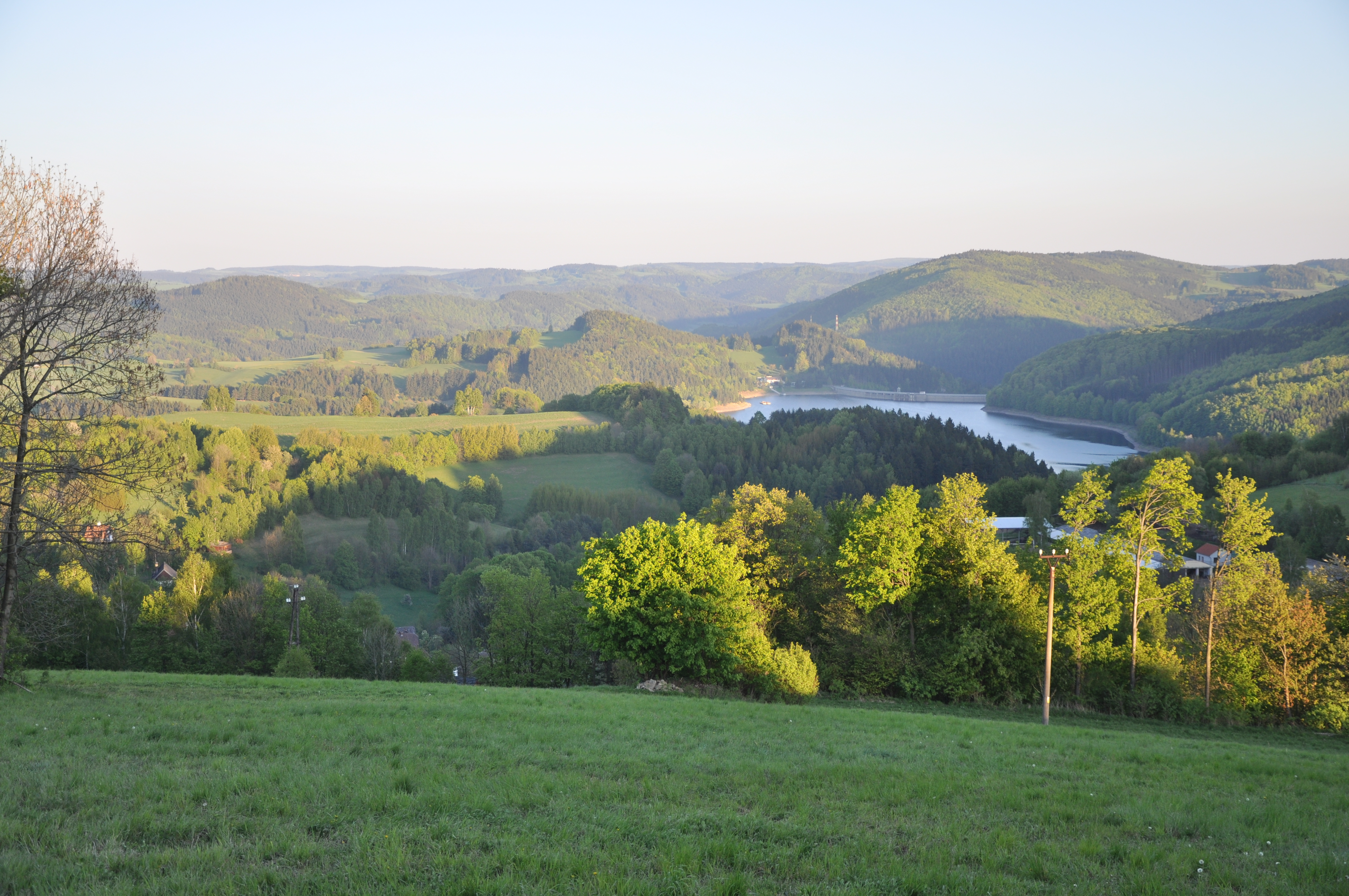
View across the Vír Reservoir

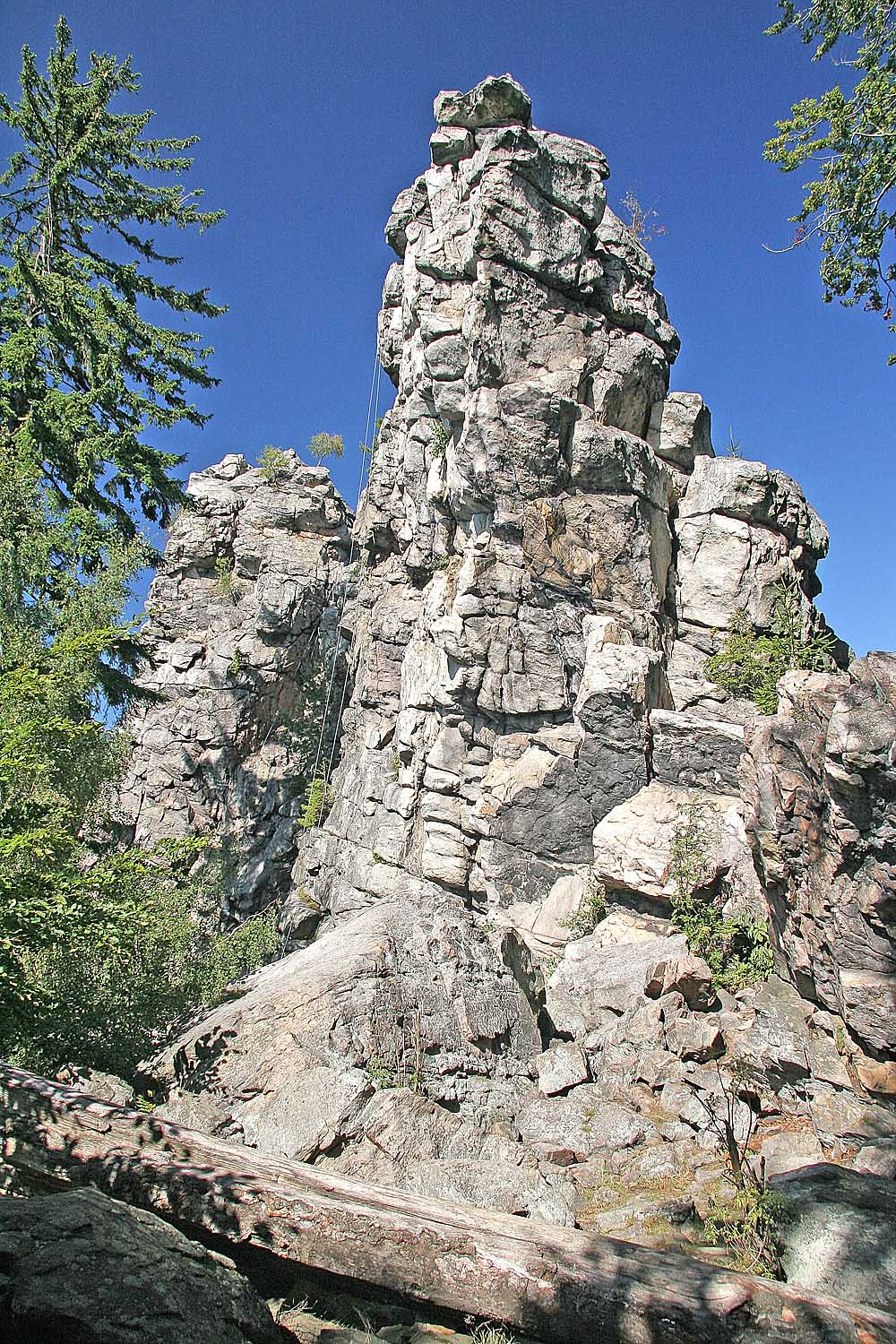
Devět skal rock

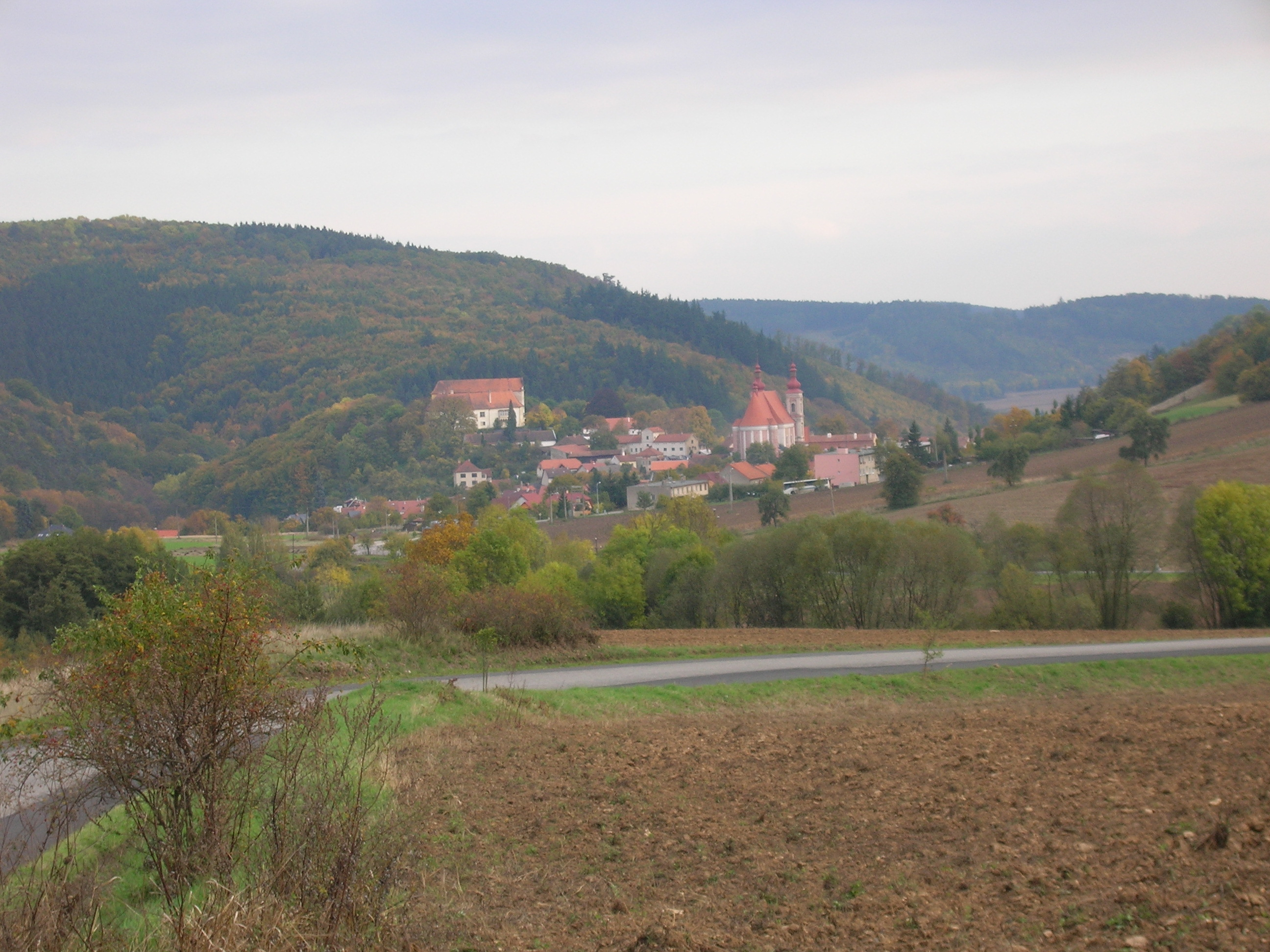
Lomnice – the southernmost part of Upper Svratka Highlands

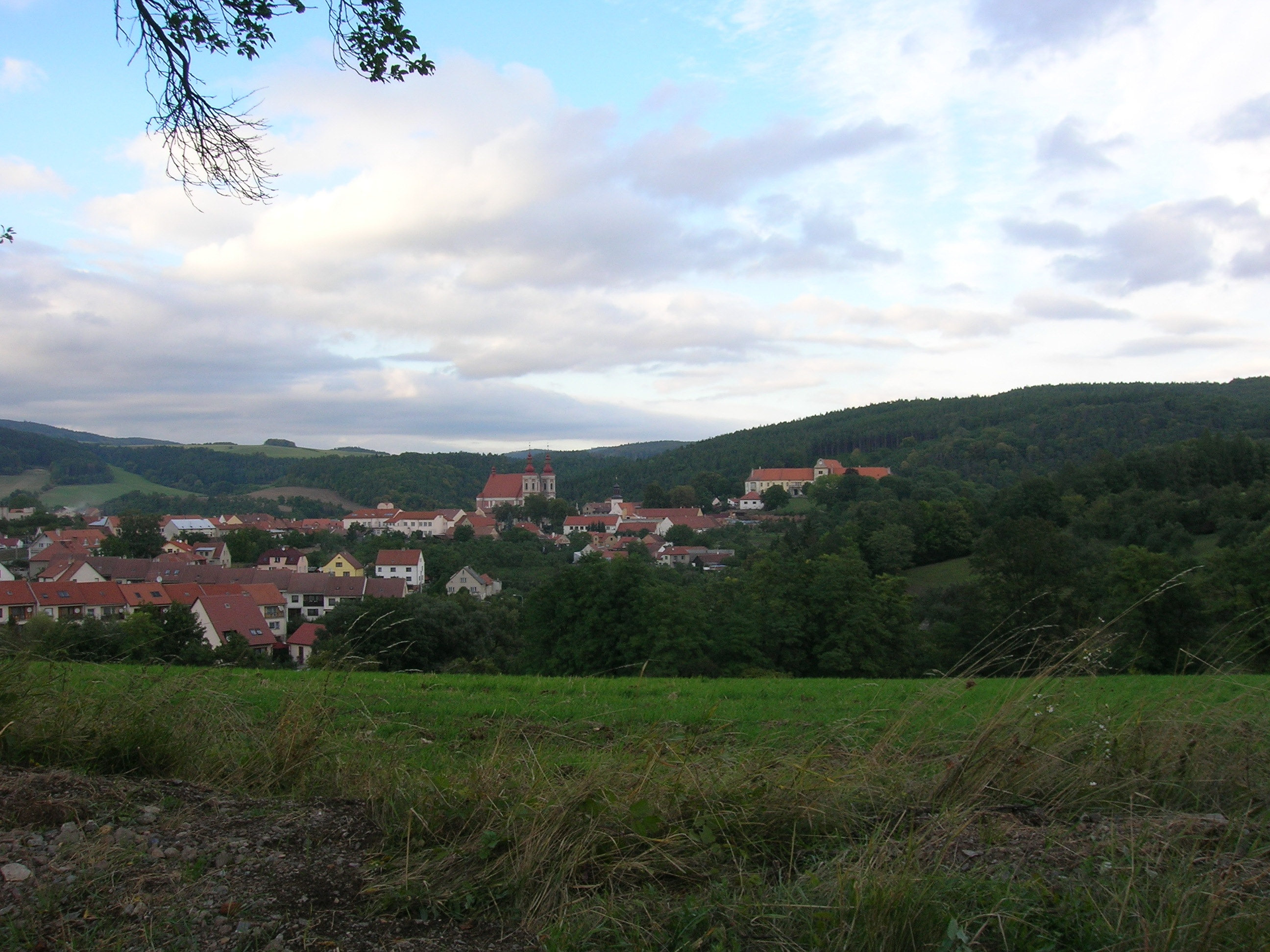
Lomnice

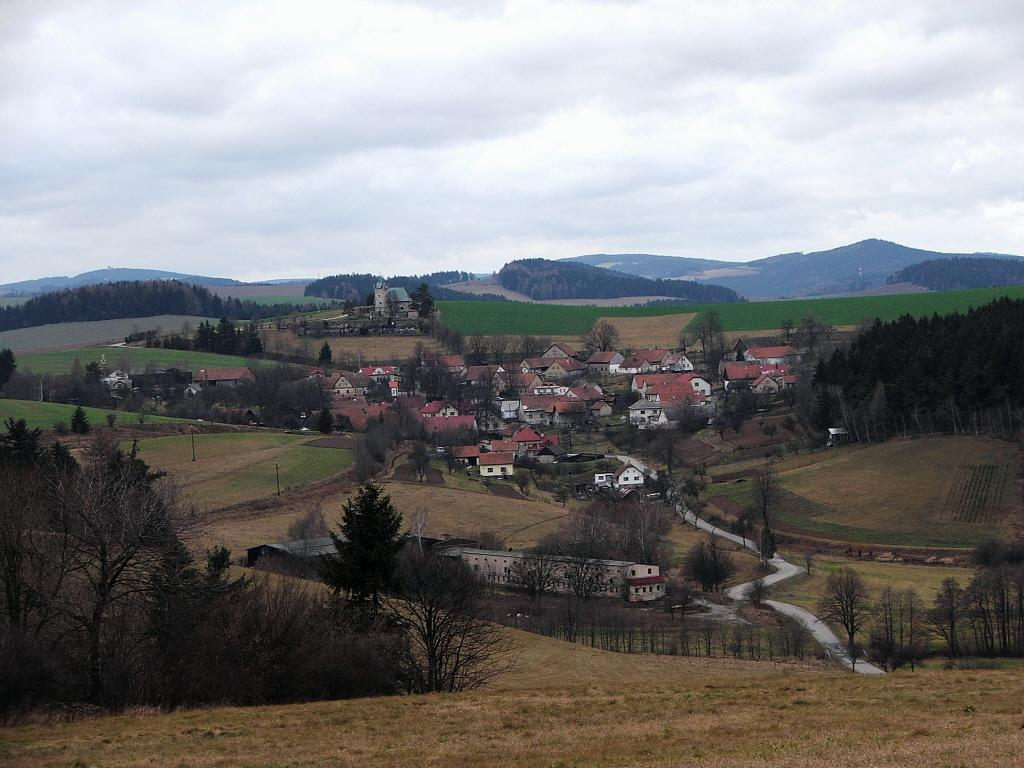
Vítochov surrounding

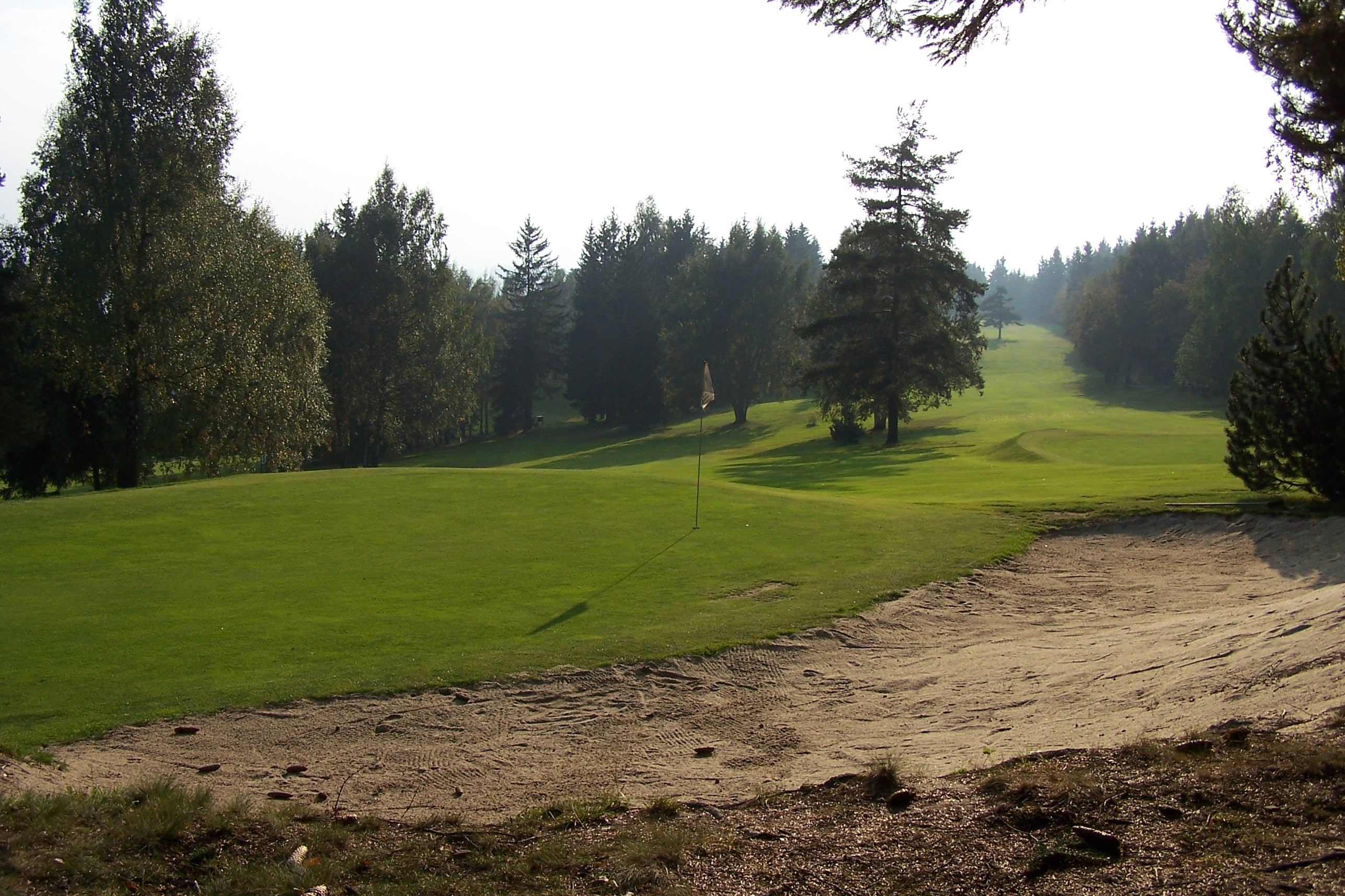
Svratka surrounding
