= Tasovice =

Tasovice may refer to places in the Czech Republic:

- Tasovice (Blansko District), a municipality and village in the South Moravian Region
- Tasovice (Znojmo District), a municipality and village in the South Moravian Region
- Tasovice, a village and part of Kostelec u Heřmanova Městce in the Pardubice Region
- Tašovice, a part of Karlovy Vary in the Karlovy Vary Region

== See also ==
- Tasov (disambiguation)
