= Tasov (Žďár nad Sázavou District) =

- Municipality
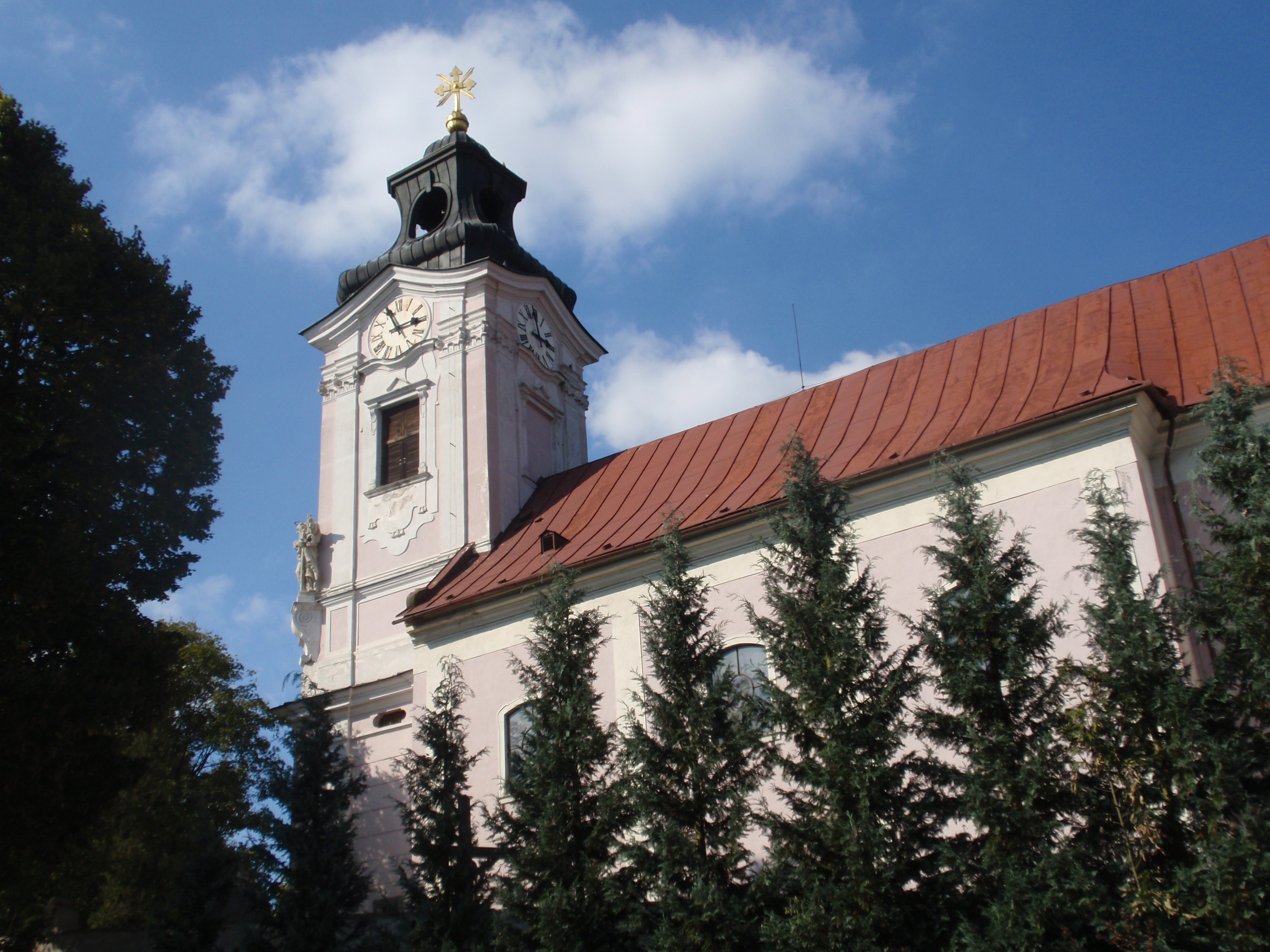
- Church of Saints Peter and Paul

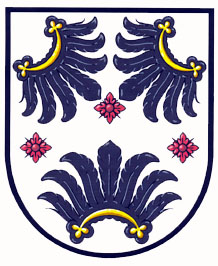
- Coat of arms

- Location in the Czech Republic
- Coordinates: 49°17′18″N 16°5′41″E
- Country: Czech Republic
- Region: Vysočina
- District: Žďár nad Sázavou
- First mentioned: 1233

Area
  - Total: 13.72 km^{2} (5.30 sq mi)
- Elevation: 410 m (1,350 ft)

Population (2026-01-01)
  - Total: 673
  - Density: 49.1/km^{2} (127/sq mi)
- Time zone: UTC+1 (CET)
  - Summer (DST): UTC+2 (CEST)
- Postal code: 675 79
- Website: www.obec-tasov.cz

Tasov (German: Tassau) is a municipality and village in Žďár nad Sázavou District in the Vysočina Region of the Czech Republic. It has about 700 inhabitants.

== Geography ==
Tasov is located about 32 kilometres (20 mi) south of Žďár nad Sázavou and 37 km (23 mi) west of Brno. It lies in the Křižanov Highlands. The highest point is at 530 m (1,740 ft) above sea level. The Oslava River forms the western border of the municipal territory. The village is situated in the valley of the Polomina Stream, which is a tributary of the Oslava.

== History ==
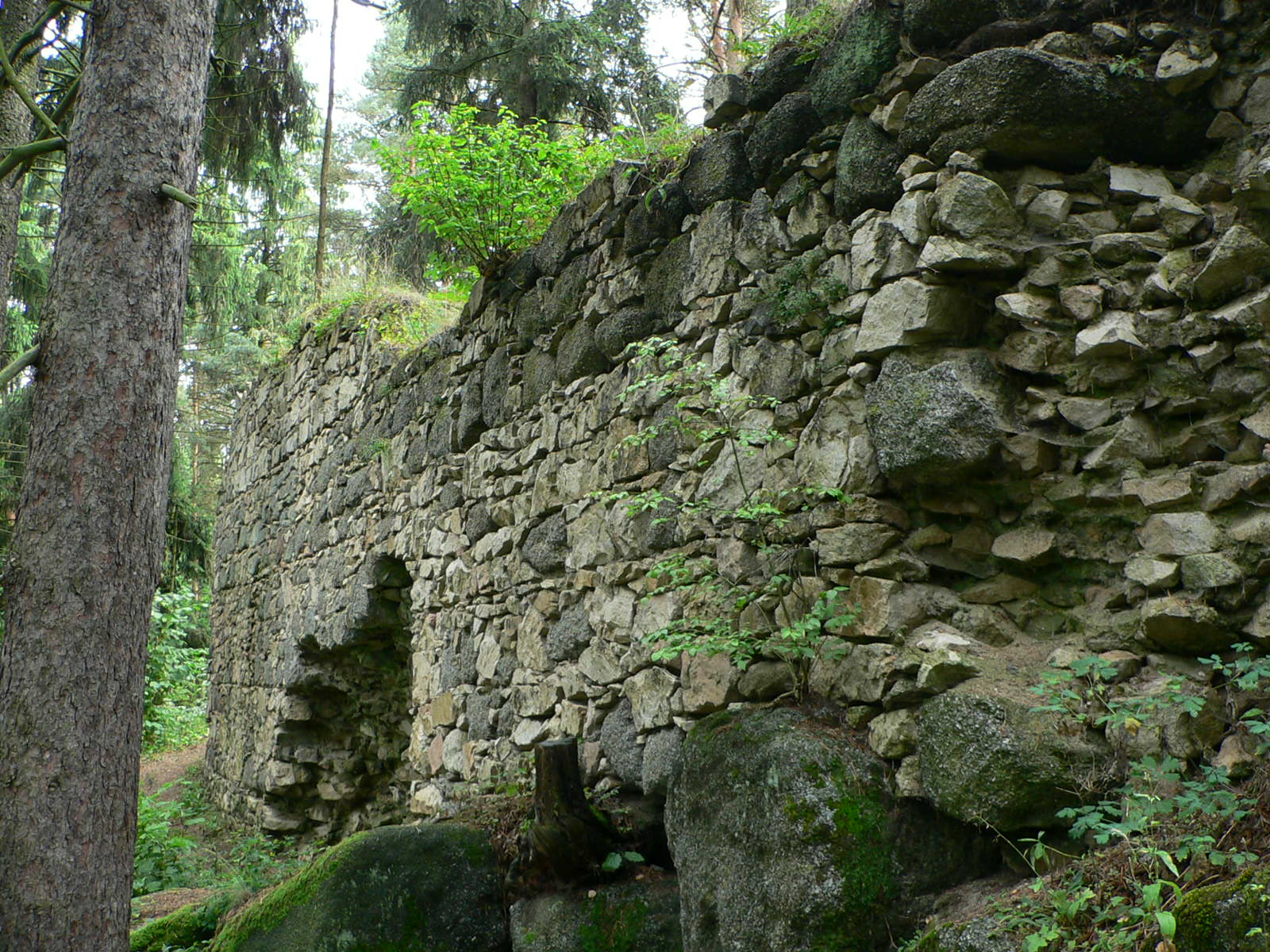
Ruin of the Dub Castle

Tasov was most likely founded in the 12th century. The establishment of the settlement was connected with the nearby fortress. The first written mention of Tasov is from 1233, when the owner of Tasov became Záviš of Tasov. The village quickly developed and became a major religious centre serving parishes in nearby villages. In 1366, Tasov was first referred to as a market town.

In 1482, the Rohovský family bought a free farmstead here and becomes a prominent family in Tasov where they stayed until the mid-20th century, at which time they were forcibly evicted by the communist government. During the Thirty Years' War, Tasov was severely affected and about a third of the houses remained desolate. Between 1573 and 1644, Tasov was owned by Václav Berka of Dubá. In 1644, Tasov was inherited by the Fürstenberk family that greatly improved Tasov and neighbouring Budišov.

After World War II, Tasov was deprived of the title of market town.

== Demographics ==
Historical population

| Year | Pop. | ±% |
|---|---|---|
| 1869 | 735 | — |
| 1880 | 849 | +15.5% |
| 1890 | 849 | +0.0% |
| 1900 | 860 | +1.3% |
| 1910 | 924 | +7.4% |

| Year | Pop. | ±% |
|---|---|---|
| 1921 | 887 | −4.0% |
| 1930 | 936 | +5.5% |
| 1950 | 804 | −14.1% |
| 1961 | 805 | +0.1% |
| 1970 | 760 | −5.6% |

| Year | Pop. | ±% |
|---|---|---|
| 1980 | 691 | −9.1% |
| 1991 | 620 | −10.3% |
| 2001 | 605 | −2.4% |
| 2011 | 586 | −3.1% |
| 2021 | 654 | +11.6% |

Source: Censuses

== Transport ==
The D1 motorway from Prague to Brno briefly runs through the northern part of the municipality.

== Sights ==
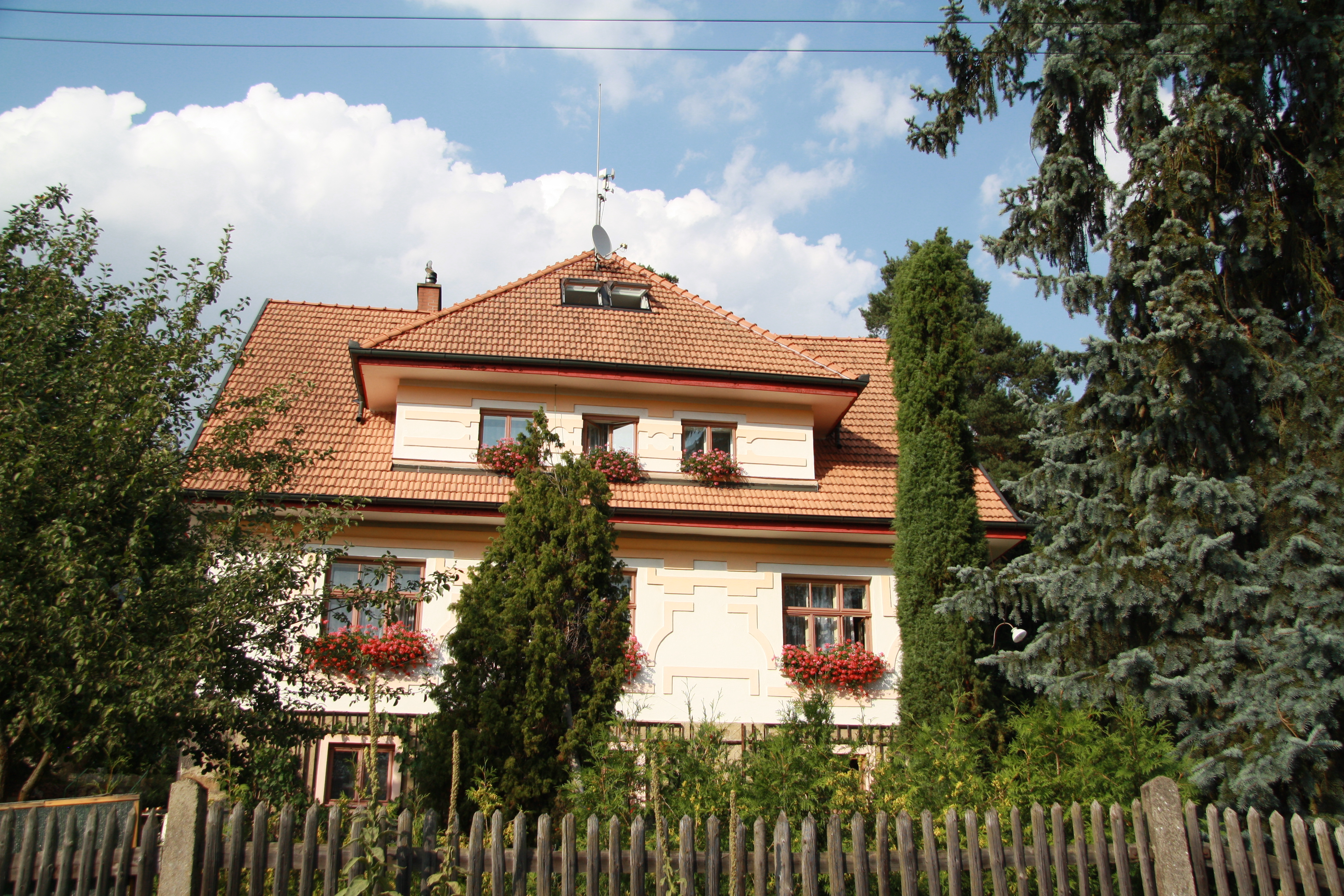
Jakub Deml's villa

The Church of Saints Peter and Paul is the landmark of the village centre. It was built in the Baroque style in 1728–1730. The interior is richly decorated. The most valuable is the painting of Saint Wenceslaus, which was moved here from the Church of Saint Wenceslaus, which stood in Tasov until 1785. The belltower has two bells from the years 1483 and 1763.

The Dub Castle, also called Tassenberg Castle, is a ruin of a Gothic castle located in a meander of the Oslava. It was built in the 13th century. In 1551, it was already called a ruin.

Hrádek is a ruin of a Gothic fortress above the village. Its existence was first documented in 1390. Since 1569, it has been desolated.

The Literary Monument of Vysočina was opened in 2002. It contains exhibitions dedicated to the important native, writer Jakub Deml and other artists connected with the region, and to the history of the village and local monuments. An architectonical monument is also the villa of Jakub Deml that replaced his original birth house. It is a modernist villa with cubist elements by the architect Bohuslav Fuchs, built in the early 1920s.

== Notable people ==
- Jakub Deml (1878–1961), writer
