= Ostrov nad Oslavou =

- Market town
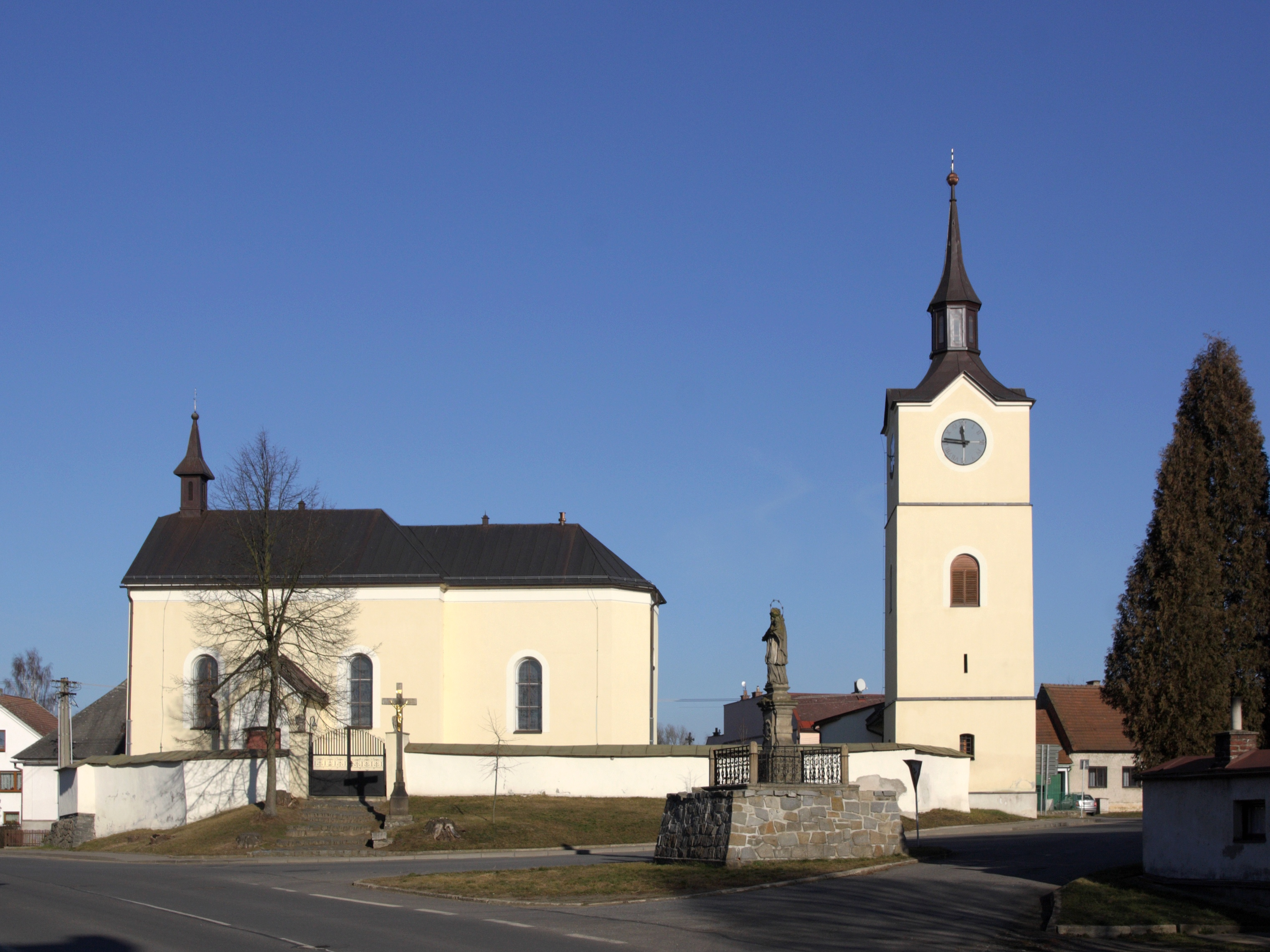
- Church of Saint James the Great

- Flag Coat of arms

- Location in the Czech Republic
- Coordinates: 49°29′13″N 15°59′24″E
- Country: Czech Republic
- Region: Vysočina
- District: Žďár nad Sázavou
- First mentioned: 1355

Area
  - Total: 9.33 km^{2} (3.60 sq mi)
- Elevation: 520 m (1,710 ft)

Population (2026-01-01)
  - Total: 1,000
  - Density: 110/km^{2} (280/sq mi)
- Time zone: UTC+1 (CET)
  - Summer (DST): UTC+2 (CEST)
- Postal code: 594 45
- Website: ostrovno.cz

Ostrov nad Oslavou (Czech pronunciation: [ˈostrof ˈnat oslavou]) is a market town in Žďár nad Sázavou District in the Vysočina Region of the Czech Republic. It has about 1,000 inhabitants.

== Administrative division ==
Ostrov nad Oslavou consists of two municipal parts (in brackets population according to the 2021 census):

- Ostrov nad Oslavou (895)
- Suky (30)

== Geography ==
Ostrov nad Oslavou is located about 9 kilometres (6 mi) south of Žďár nad Sázavou and 30 km (19 mi) east of Jihlava. It lies in the Křižanov Highlands. The highest point is at 584 m (1,916 ft) above sea level. The market town is situated on the Oslava River, at its confluence with the stream Bohdalovský potok. There are several fishponds around the market town.

== History ==
The first written mention of Ostrov is from 1355. It was probably founded shortly after 1250. During the Thirty Years' War, in 1621, Ostrov was completely burned down, but was renewed before the war ended. The village of Suky was first documented in 1644. In 1709, Ostrov was referred to as a market town for the first time.

In 1920, the name of the municipality was changed from Ostrov to Ostrov nad Oslavou. The municipality was officially promoted to a market town in 1922. In 1960, Suky was joined to Ostrov nad Oslavou.

== Demographics ==
Historical population

Year	Pop.	±%
1869	956	—
1880	912	−4.6%
1890	839	−8.0%
1900	804	−4.2%
1910	748	−7.0%

Year	Pop.	±%
1921	762	+1.9%
1930	706	−7.3%
1950	674	−4.5%
1961	742	+10.1%
1970	804	+8.4%

Year	Pop.	±%
1980	815	+1.4%
1991	873	+7.1%
2001	887	+1.6%
2011	905	+2.0%
2021	925	+2.2%

Source: Censuses

== Transport ==
The I/37 road, which connects the D1 motorway with Žďár nad Sázavou and continues to Pardubice, runs through Ostrov nad Oslavou.

Ostrov nad Oslavou is located on the railway line Žďár nad Sázavou–Křižanov.

== Sights ==
The main landmark is the Church of Saint James the Great. It was rebuilt into its present form in 1885. It has a separate bell tower, which dates from 1845.
