= Nové Veselí =

- Market town
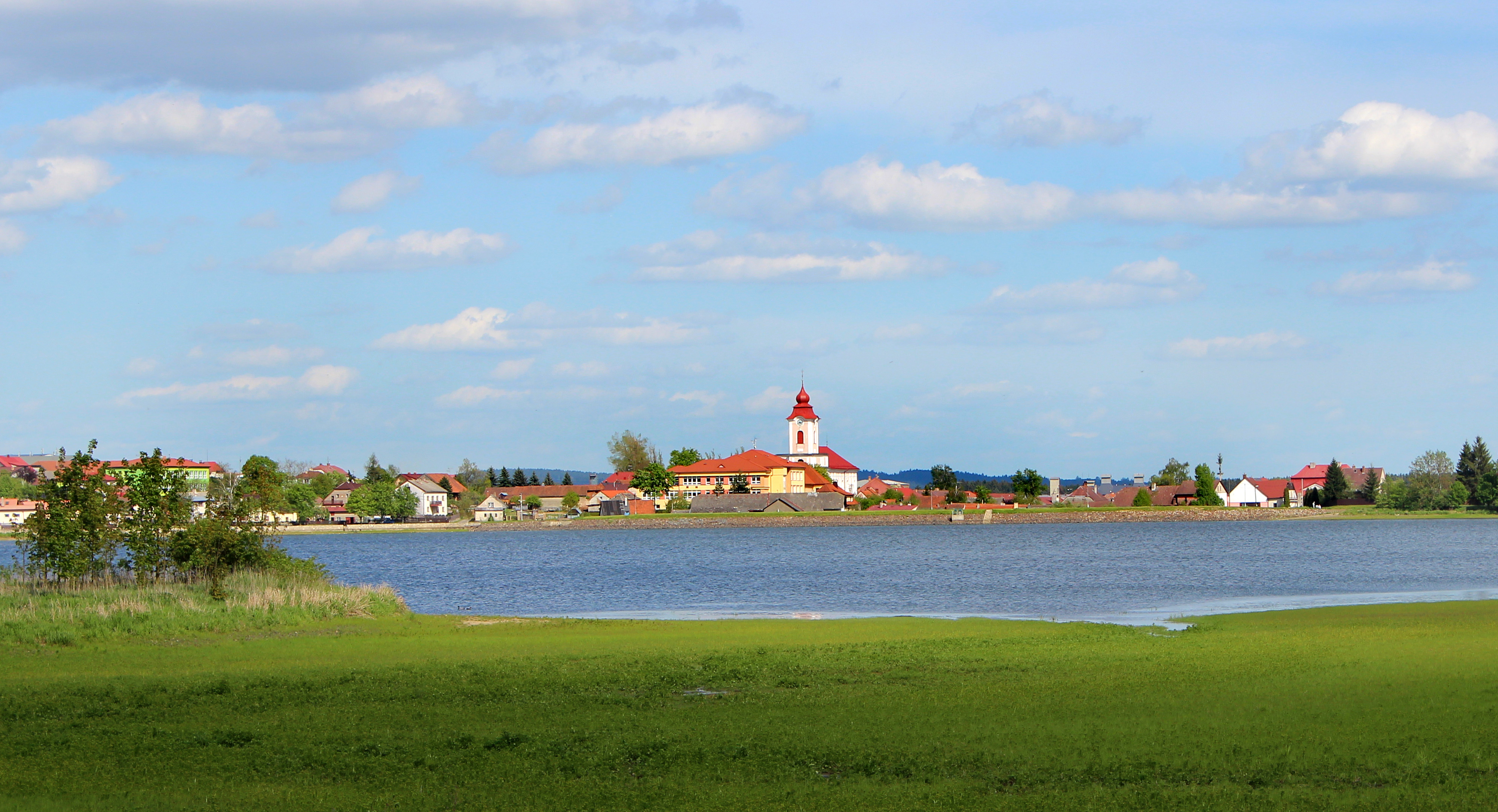
- View across the Veselský Pond

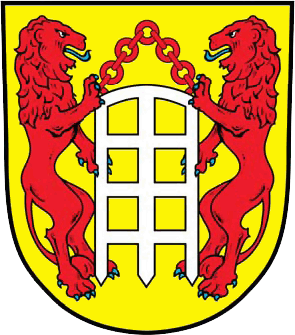
- Flag Coat of arms

- Location in the Czech Republic
- Coordinates: 49°31′11″N 15°54′31″E
- Country: Czech Republic
- Region: Vysočina
- District: Žďár nad Sázavou
- First mentioned: 1377

Area
  - Total: 9.53 km^{2} (3.68 sq mi)
- Elevation: 555 m (1,821 ft)

Population (2026-01-01)
  - Total: 1,369
  - Density: 144/km^{2} (372/sq mi)
- Time zone: UTC+1 (CET)
  - Summer (DST): UTC+2 (CEST)
- Postal code: 592 14
- Website: www.noveveseli.cz

Nové Veselí (Czech pronunciation: [ˈnovɛː ˈvɛsɛliː]) is a market town in Žďár nad Sázavou District in the Vysočina Region of the Czech Republic. It has about 1,400 inhabitants.

== Geography ==
Nové Veselí is located about 5 kilometres (3 mi) south of Žďár nad Sázavou and 26 km (16 mi) northeast of Jihlava. It lies in the Křižanov Highlands. The highest point is at 582 m (1,909 ft) above sea level. The Oslava River flows through the market town. The territory is rich in fishponds; the largest of them is Veselský rybník, on whose banks the market town lies. The northern half of the municipal territory lies within the Žďárské vrchy Protected Landscape Area.

== History ==
The first written mention of Veselí is in a deed from 1377, where the change of owner in 1368 is mentioned. The settlement was first referred to as a market town in 1529. In 1563, the name was changed to Nové Veselí. The fishpond Veselský rybník was created in the second half of the 16th century, probably by the Pernštejn family.

== Demographics ==
Historical population

Year	Pop.	±%
1869	838	—
1880	983	+17.3%
1890	878	−10.7%
1900	985	+12.2%
1910	878	−10.9%

Year	Pop.	±%
1921	832	−5.2%
1930	774	−7.0%
1950	791	+2.2%
1961	932	+17.8%
1970	945	+1.4%

Year	Pop.	±%
1980	1,091	+15.4%
1991	1,170	+7.2%
2001	1,223	+4.5%
2011	1,238	+1.2%
2021	1,295	+4.6%

Source: Censuses

== Transport ==
There are no railways or major roads passing through the municipality.

== Sights ==
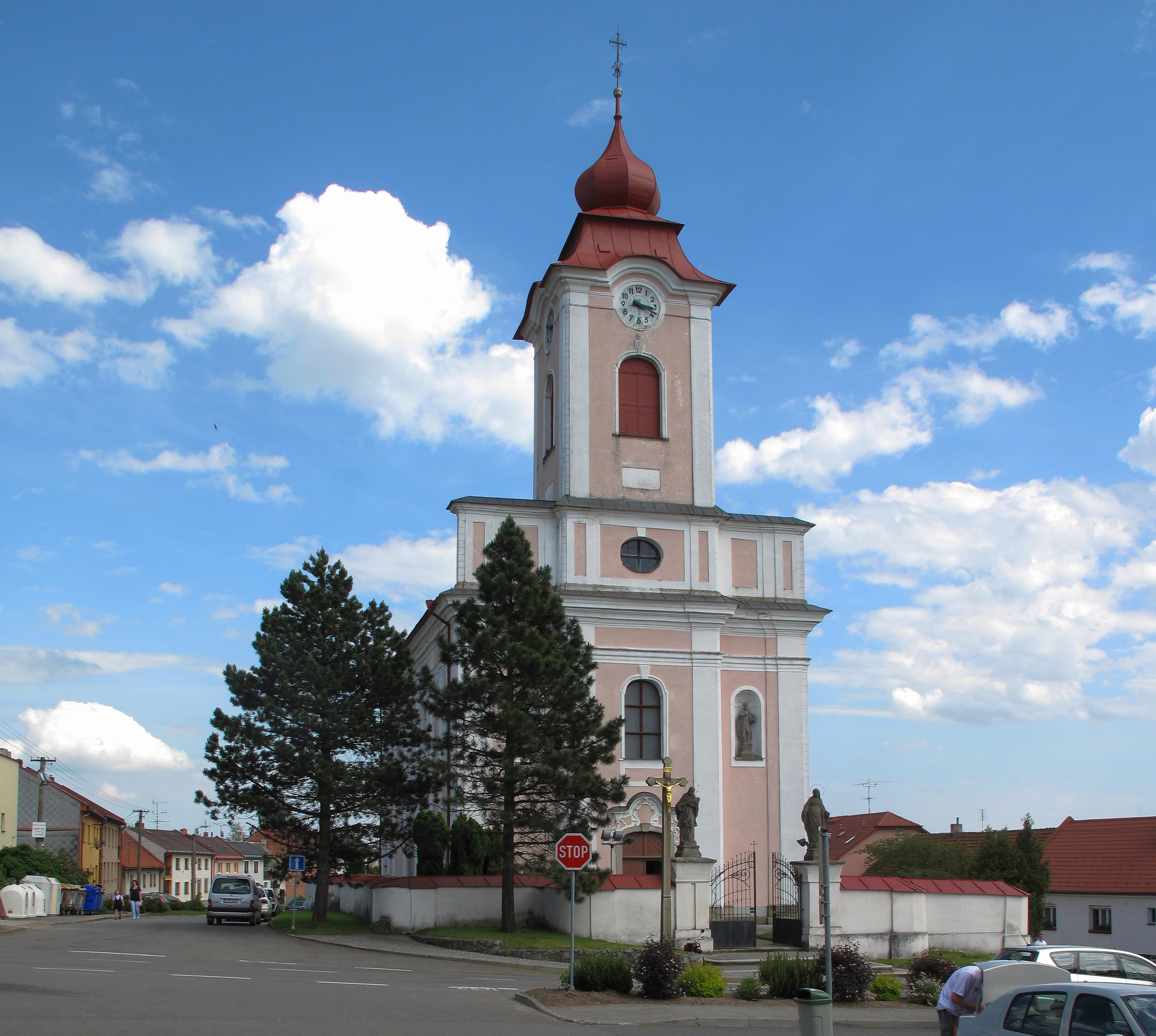
Church of Saint Wenceslaus

The main landmark of Nové Veselí is the Church of Saint Wenceslaus. It was built in the Baroque style in 1752–1757.

The former fortress from 1447 was rebuilt into a small Renaissance castle. In modern times, the building has been converted into apartments.

A technical monument is the medieval watermill with preserved Gothic and Renaissance details. The façade is decorated with sgraffito.
