= Velká Losenice =

- Municipality
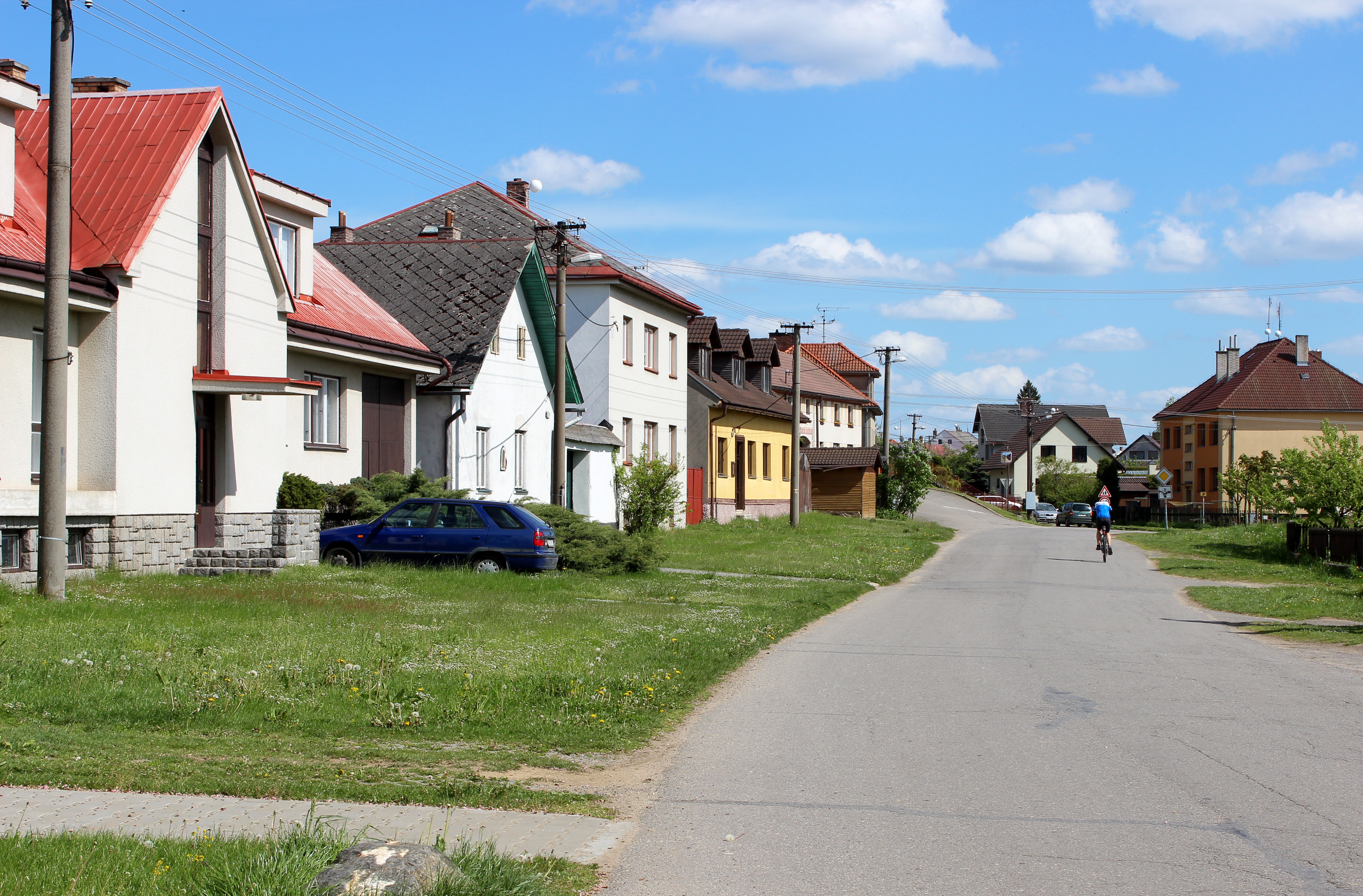
- Common in Velká Losenice

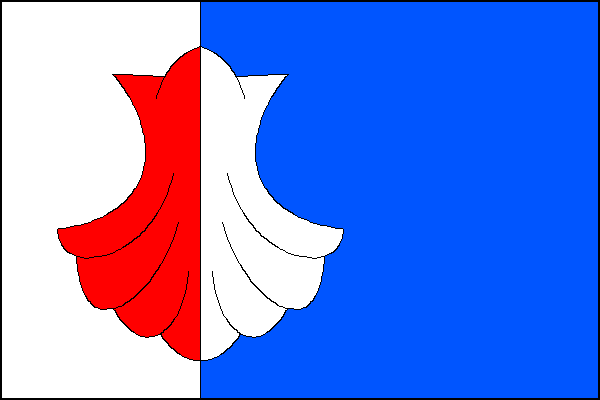
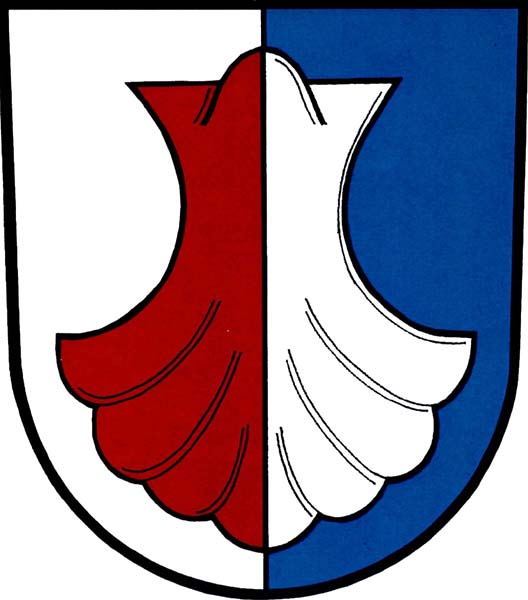
- Flag Coat of arms

- Location in the Czech Republic
- Coordinates: 49°34′51″N 15°50′12″E
- Country: Czech Republic
- Region: Vysočina
- District: Žďár nad Sázavou
- First mentioned: 1352

Area
  - Total: 14.90 km^{2} (5.75 sq mi)
- Elevation: 548 m (1,798 ft)

Population (2026-01-01)
  - Total: 1,215
  - Density: 81.54/km^{2} (211.2/sq mi)
- Time zone: UTC+1 (CET)
  - Summer (DST): UTC+2 (CEST)
- Postal code: 592 11
- Website: www.losenice.cz

Velká Losenice is a municipality and village in Žďár nad Sázavou District in the Vysočina Region of the Czech Republic. It has about 1,200 inhabitants.

== Administrative division ==
Velká Losenice consists of two municipal parts (in brackets population according to the 2021 census):

- Velká Losenice (1,090)
- Pořežín (67)

== Geography ==
Velká Losenice is located about 7 kilometres (4 mi) west of Žďár nad Sázavou and 26 km (16 mi) northeast of Jihlava. Most of the municipal territory lies in the Upper Sázava Hills, only the northeastern part extends into the Křižanov Highlands. The highest point is a hill at 640 m (2,100 ft) above sea level. There are several fishponds in the municipality. The northeastern half of the municipality is situated in the Žďárské vrchy Protected Landscape Area.

== History ==
The first written mention of Velká Losenice is from 1352. It was probably founded at the turn of the 12th and 13th centuries. In 1366, a hammer mill in Velká Losenice was documented. From 1502, the village was part of the Polná estate. Between 1597 and 1620, the estate was owned by the Zeidlitz family, but their properties were confiscated after the Battle of White Mountain. In 1623, the estate was acquired by the Dietrichstein family.

== Demographics ==
Historical population

Year	Pop.	±%
1869	1,143	—
1880	1,210	+5.9%
1890	1,177	−2.7%
1900	1,141	−3.1%
1910	1,197	+4.9%

Year	Pop.	±%
1921	1,180	−1.4%
1930	1,145	−3.0%
1950	987	−13.8%
1961	1,054	+6.8%
1970	973	−7.7%

Year	Pop.	±%
1980	954	−2.0%
1991	964	+1.0%
2001	979	+1.6%
2011	1,173	+19.8%
2021	1,157	−1.4%

Source: Censuses

== Transport ==
The I/19 road from Žďár nad Sázavou to Havlíčkův Brod runs through the municipality, outside the built-up area.

== Sights ==
The main landmark of Velká Losenice is the Church of Saint James the Great. It is a Gothic building with an early Gothic core, which is among the oldest churches in the region.

The main landmarks of Pořežín are a belfry from the 19th century and the former Durnštejn fortress.
