= Oslavany =

- Town
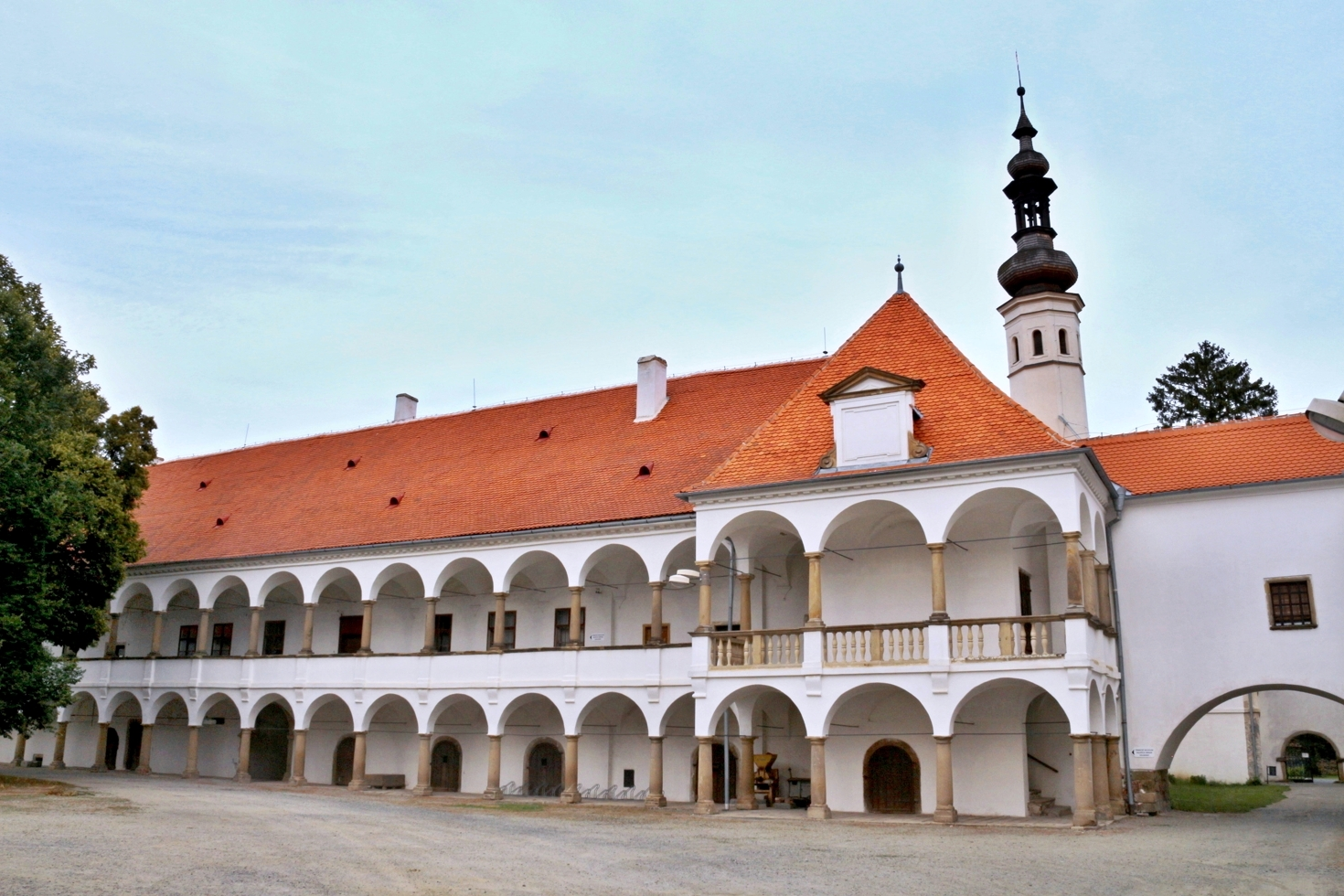
- Oslavany Castle

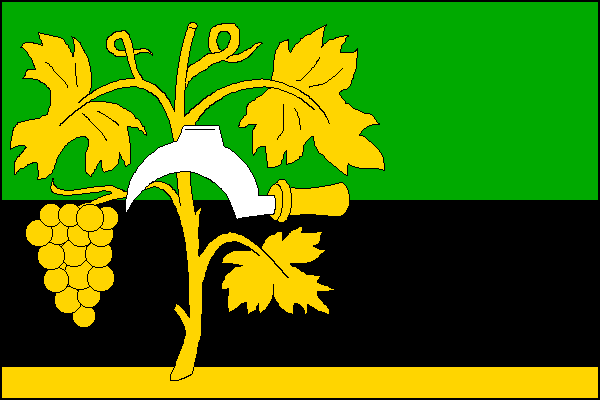
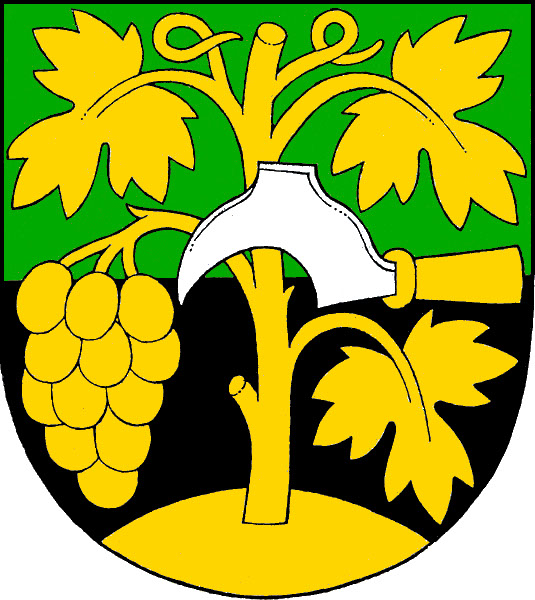
- Flag Coat of arms

- Location in the Czech Republic
- Coordinates: 49°7′24″N 16°20′12″E
- Country: Czech Republic
- Region: South Moravian
- District: Brno-Country
- First mentioned: 1104

Government
  - Mayor: Vít Aldorf

Area
  - Total: 18.71 km^{2} (7.22 sq mi)
- Elevation: 230 m (750 ft)

Population (2026-01-01)
  - Total: 4,844
  - Density: 258.9/km^{2} (670.5/sq mi)
- Time zone: UTC+1 (CET)
  - Summer (DST): UTC+2 (CEST)
- Postal code: 664 12
- Website: www.oslavany-mesto.cz

Oslavany (Czech pronunciation: [ˈoslavanɪ]) is a town in Brno-Country District in the South Moravian Region of the Czech Republic. It has about 4,800 inhabitants. The town is located on the Oslava River.

Oslavany was founded at the beginning of the 12th century at the latest. From the 18th to the 20th century, it was an industrial town. Among the main landmarks of Oslavany are the Oslavany Castle and the Church of Saint Nicholas.

== Administrative division ==
Oslavany consists of two municipal parts (in brackets population according to the 2021 census):

- Oslavany (4,083)
- Padochov (596)

== Etymology ==
The word Oslavan was a designation for a person living near the Oslava River. The name Oslavany means "the village of people who live near the Oslava".

== Geography ==
Oslavany is located about 19 kilometres (12 mi) southwest of Brno. Most of the territory lies in the Boskovice Furrow, but the western part of the municipal territory extends into the Křižanov Highlands and Jevišovice Uplands. The highest point is at 409 m (1,342 ft) above sea level. The Oslava River flows through the town.

== History ==
The first written mention of Oslavany is from 1104. It was originally an agricultural and wine-growing village. In the 13th century, copper and other metals were mined in the adjacent hills. In 1225, the first Cistercian convent in Moravia was founded here. The village of Oslavany was owned by the convent until the 16th century. When the convent was dissolved in 1525, Oslavany was acquired by the Althan family and the convent was rebuilt into a Renaissance residence.

In 1760, hard coal deposits were found here and soon it was the only place in Moravia where coal was mined. The greatest development of mining occurred in the 19th century and especially after 1913, when a power plant was established here. Coal mining and electricity generation changed the village both economically and environmentally. In the 1960s, the population of Oslavany grew rapidly as housing estates were built for the new employers. Coal mining ceased in 1973 and electricity production in 1993. As a result, the town has lost its industrial character.

== Demographics ==
Historical population

| Year | Pop. | ±% |
|---|---|---|
| 1869 | 2,832 | — |
| 1880 | 3,001 | +6.0% |
| 1890 | 3,134 | +4.4% |
| 1900 | 3,481 | +11.1% |
| 1910 | 4,073 | +17.0% |

| Year | Pop. | ±% |
|---|---|---|
| 1921 | 4,669 | +14.6% |
| 1930 | 4,719 | +1.1% |
| 1950 | 4,533 | −3.9% |
| 1961 | 5,262 | +16.1% |
| 1970 | 5,285 | +0.4% |

| Year | Pop. | ±% |
|---|---|---|
| 1980 | 4,893 | −7.4% |
| 1991 | 4,445 | −9.2% |
| 2001 | 4,544 | +2.2% |
| 2011 | 4,619 | +1.7% |
| 2021 | 4,679 | +1.3% |

Source: Censuses

== Transport ==
There are no major roads passing through the municipality. The railway that starts here is unused.

== Sights ==
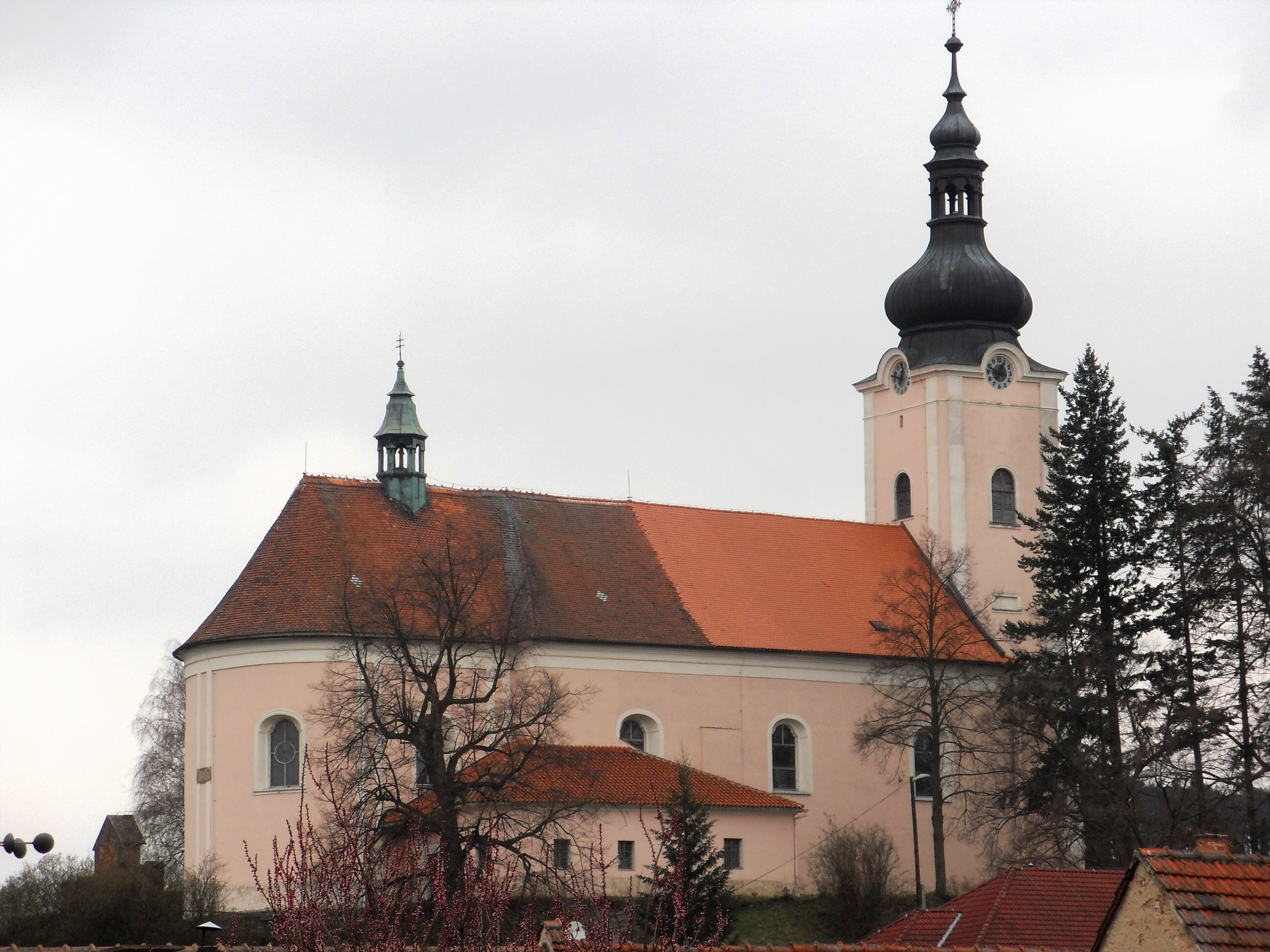
Church of Saint Nicholas

The main landmark of the town is the Oslavany Castle. It is a large Renaissance building with an arcaded courtyard. The original Gothic monastery church, which served as a castle chapel, has been preserved and is now used for concerts. Today the castle houses the Museum of Mining and Energy, and the Fire Museum.

The Church of Saint Nicholas was built in the Baroque style in the third quarter of the 18th century, after the old church from the first half of the 14th century was demolished.

== Twin towns – sister cities ==
Oslavany is twinned with:

- Nováky, Slovakia
- Schkeuditz, Germany
- Vir, Croatia
