= Matějov =

- Municipality
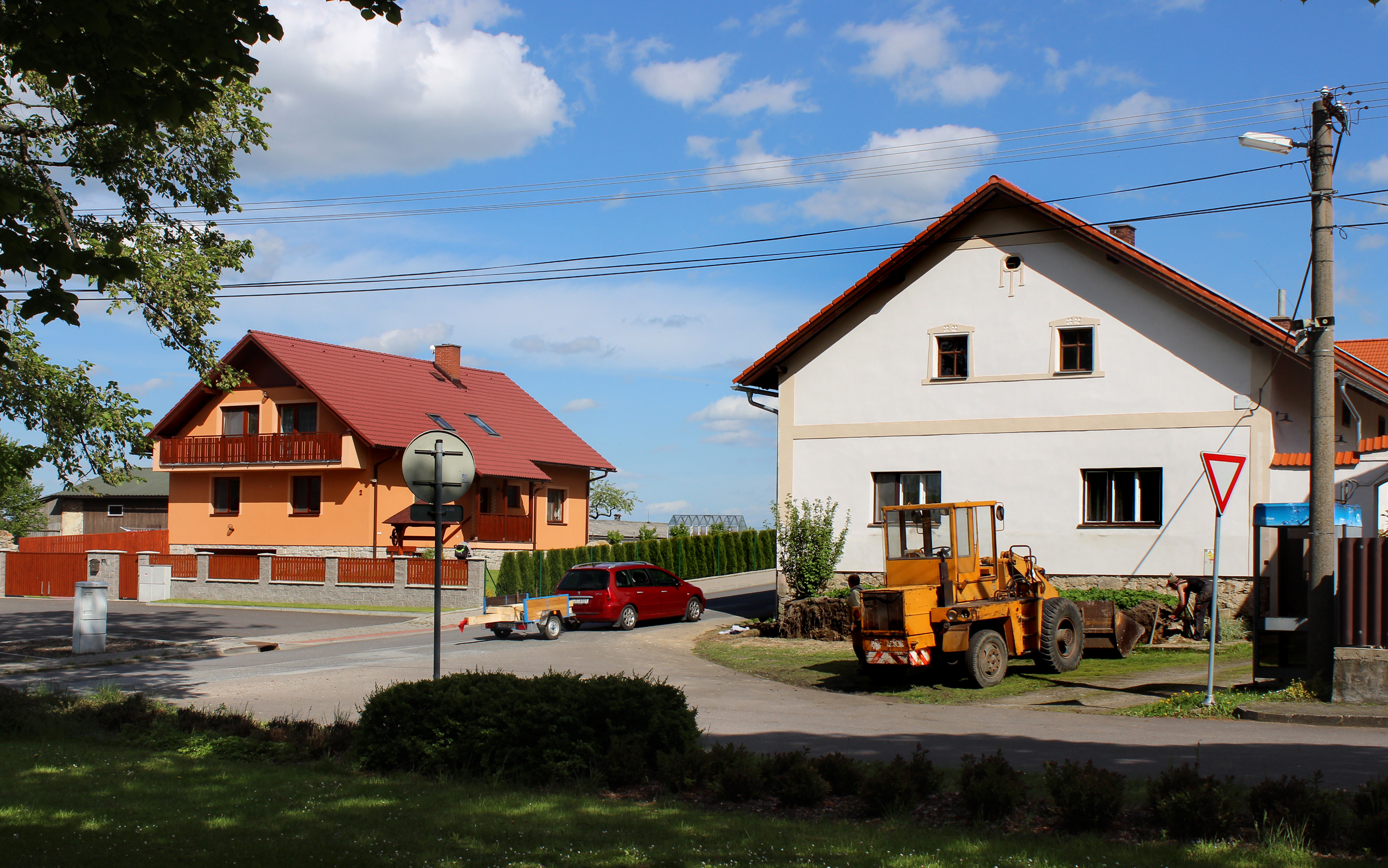
- Centre of Matějov

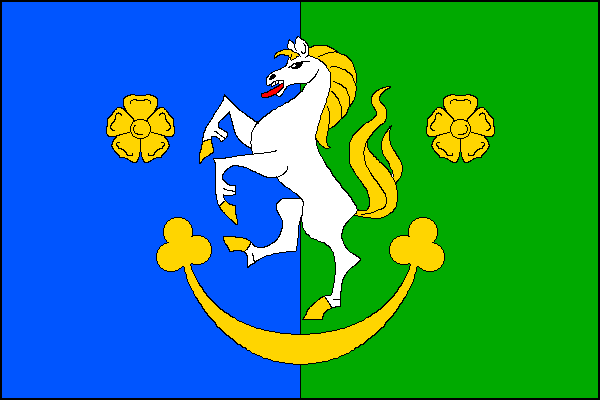
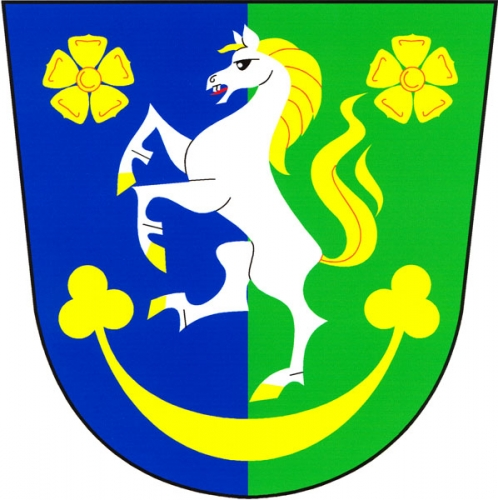
- Flag Coat of arms

- Location in the Czech Republic
- Coordinates: 49°31′43″N 15°51′47″E
- Country: Czech Republic
- Region: Vysočina
- District: Žďár nad Sázavou
- First mentioned: 1366

Area
  - Total: 9.82 km^{2} (3.79 sq mi)
- Elevation: 590 m (1,940 ft)

Population (2026-01-01)
  - Total: 200
  - Density: 20/km^{2} (53/sq mi)
- Time zone: UTC+1 (CET)
  - Summer (DST): UTC+2 (CEST)
- Postal code: 592 12
- Website: www.matejov.cz

Matějov is a municipality and village in Žďár nad Sázavou District in the Vysočina Region of the Czech Republic. It has about 200 inhabitants.

== Geography ==
Matějov is located about 6 kilometres (4 mi) southwest of Žďár nad Sázavou and 24 km (15 mi) northeast of Jihlava. It lies in the Křižanov Highlands. The highest point is at 632 m (2,073 ft) above sea level. The Oslava River originates in the municipal territory.

A notable body of water is the fishpond Matějovský rybník with an area of 60.4 ha (149 acres). The 80.8 ha (200-acre) large fishpond Veselský rybník is located just beyond the municipal border.

== History ==
The first written mention of Matějov is from 1366.

== Demographics ==
Historical population

Year	Pop.	±%
1869	199	—
1880	251	+26.1%
1890	260	+3.6%
1900	241	−7.3%
1910	271	+12.4%

Year	Pop.	±%
1921	253	−6.6%
1930	263	+4.0%
1950	203	−22.8%
1961	198	−2.5%
1970	192	−3.0%

Year	Pop.	±%
1980	202	+5.2%
1991	209	+3.5%
2001	204	−2.4%
2011	212	+3.9%
2021	195	−8.0%

Source: Censuses

== Transport ==
There are no railways or major roads passing through the municipality.

== Sights ==
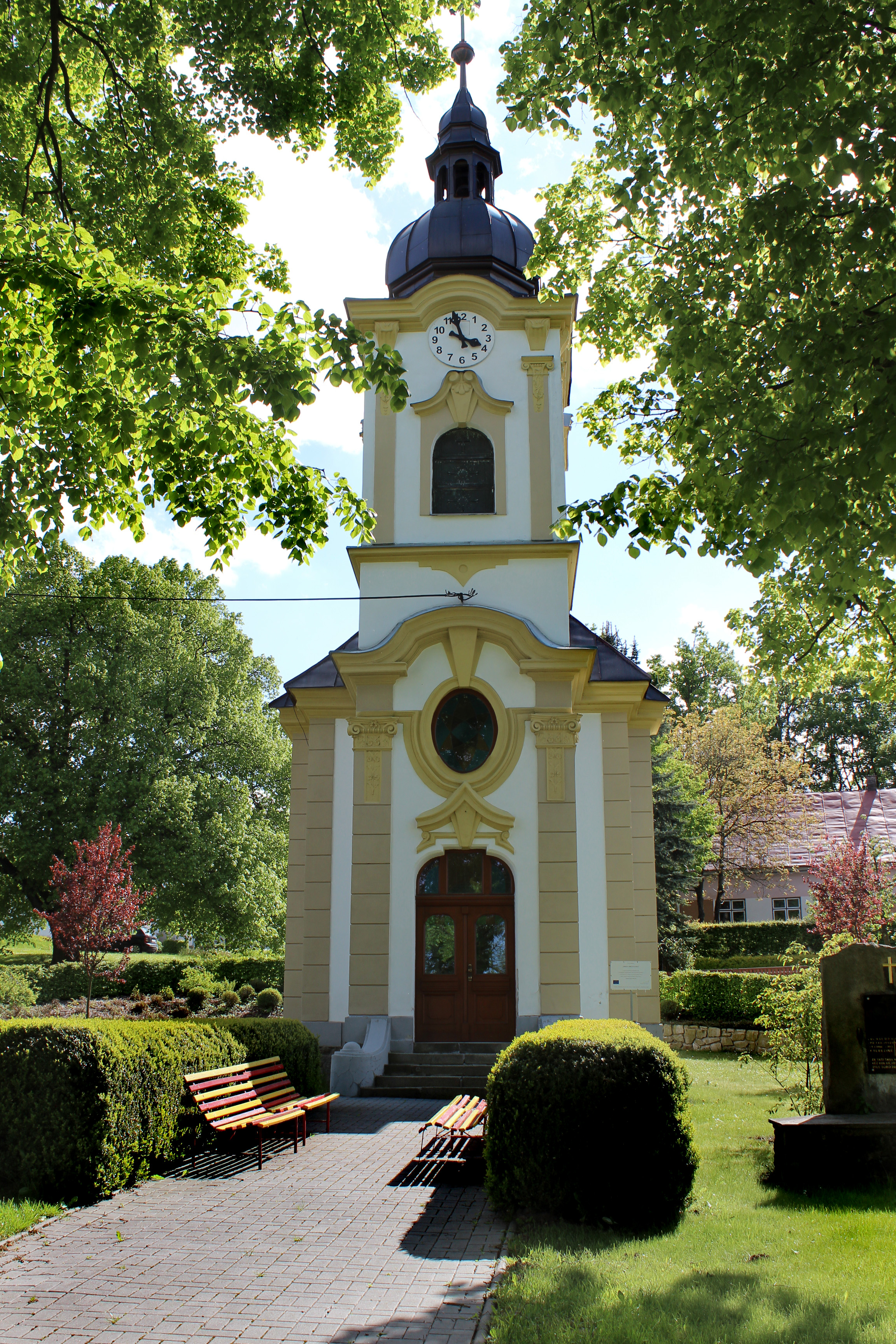
Chapel of the Visitation of the Virgin Mary

The only protected cultural monuments in the municipality are a stone cross from 1828 and a Baroque column shrine.

The main landmark of Matějov is the Chapel of the Visitation of the Virgin Mary. It was built in 1907–1908.
