= Hodíškov =

- Municipality
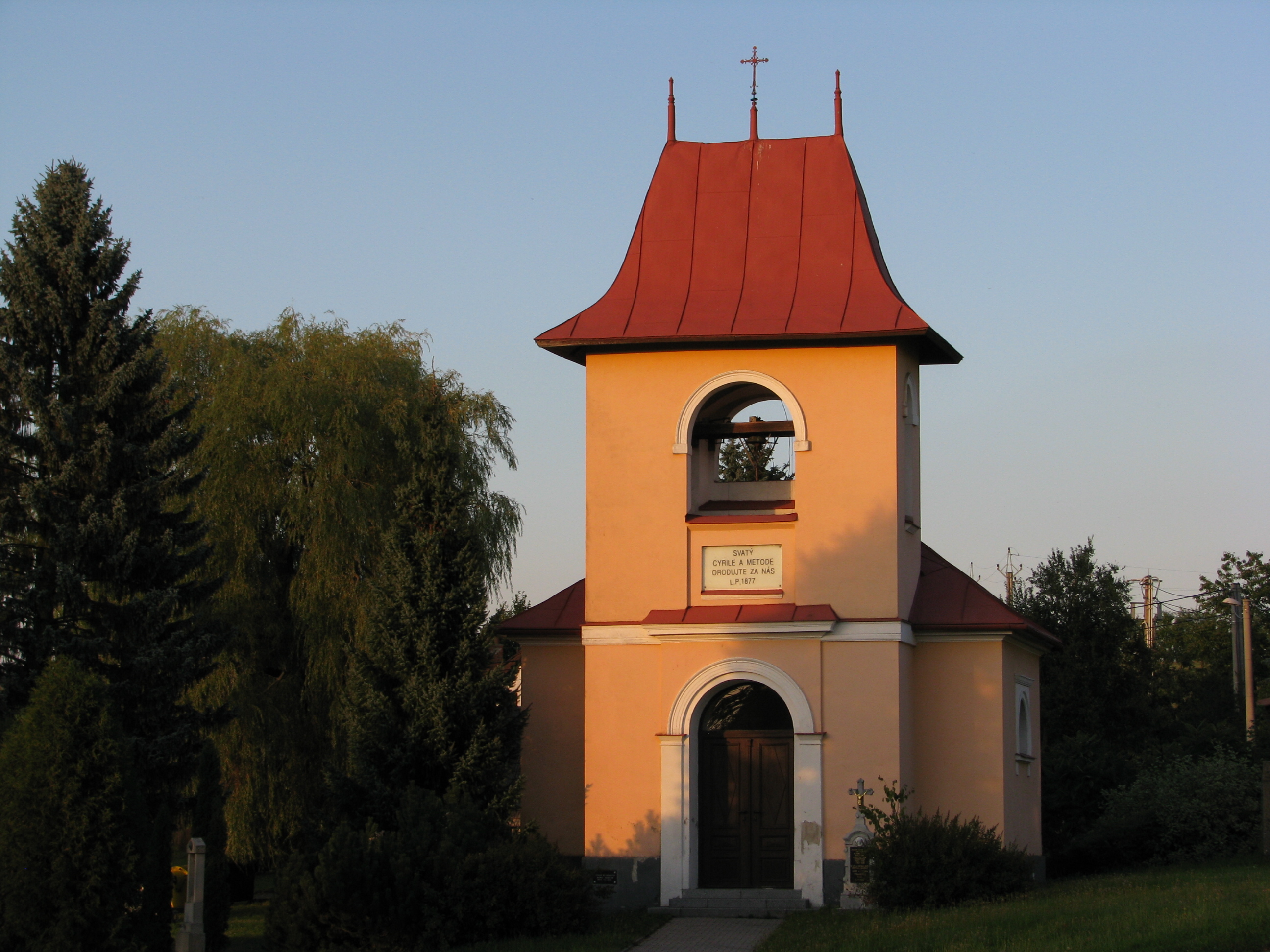
- Chapel of Saints Cyril and Methodius

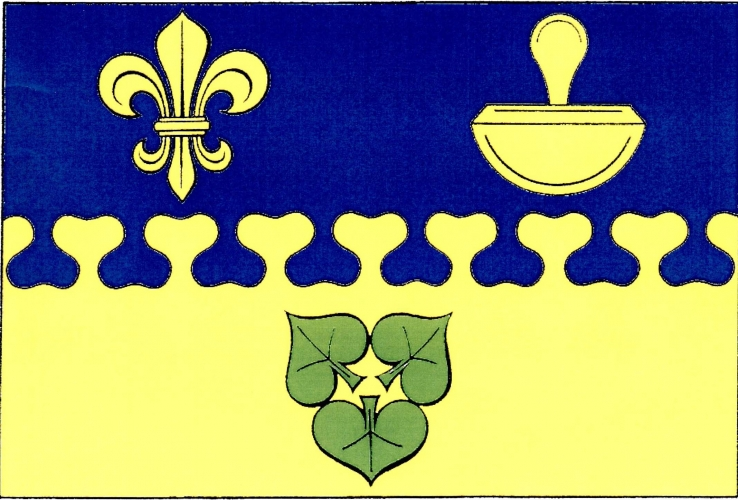
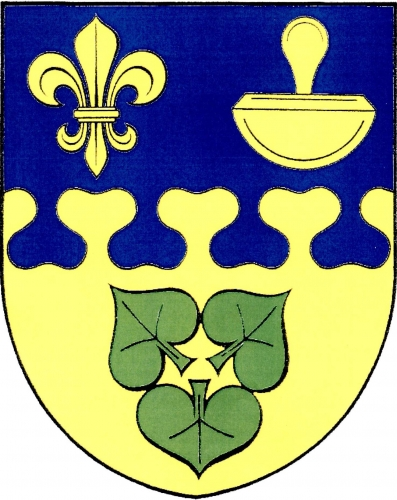
- Flag Coat of arms

- Location in the Czech Republic
- Coordinates: 49°20′47″N 16°5′29″E
- Country: Czech Republic
- Region: Vysočina
- District: Žďár nad Sázavou
- First mentioned: 1412

Area
  - Total: 5.14 km^{2} (1.98 sq mi)
- Elevation: 582 m (1,909 ft)

Population (2026-01-01)
  - Total: 147
  - Density: 28.6/km^{2} (74.1/sq mi)
- Time zone: UTC+1 (CET)
  - Summer (DST): UTC+2 (CEST)
- Postal code: 591 01
- Website: www.hodiskov.cz

Hodíškov (German: Hodischkau) is a municipality and village in Žďár nad Sázavou District in the Vysočina Region of the Czech Republic. It has about 100 inhabitants.

== Geography ==
Hodíškov is located about 9 kilometres (6 mi) southeast of Žďár nad Sázavou and 34 km (21 mi) east of Jihlava. It lies in the Křižanov Highlands. The highest point is at 616 m (2,021 ft) above sea level. The municipal territory is rich in fishponds. The most notable of them is Hodíškovský rybník, protected together with its immediate surroundings as a nature monument.

== History ==
The first written mention of Hodíškov is from 1417. In the 15th century, Hodíškov was owned by the Konáč family. As of 1653, Hodíškov consisted of eight farms. The village was part of the Žďár estate until 1850 when it gained independence. From 1813 to 1945, the Linsbauer family was the most prominent family in Hodíškov.

== Demographics ==
Historical population

Year	Pop.	±%
1869	293	—
1880	309	+5.5%
1890	330	+6.8%
1900	292	−11.5%
1910	262	−10.3%

Year	Pop.	±%
1921	231	−11.8%
1930	228	−1.3%
1950	190	−16.7%
1961	183	−3.7%
1970	201	+9.8%

Year	Pop.	±%
1980	189	−6.0%
1991	145	−23.3%
2001	136	−6.2%
2011	141	+3.7%
2021	148	+5.0%

Source: Censuses

== Transport ==
There are no railways or major roads passing through the municipality.

== Sights ==
The only protected cultural monument in the municipality is a stone cross from 1857. The main landmark of the village is the Chapel of Saints Cyril and Methodius, built in 1874–1877.
