= Jakub Deml =

Czech Catholic priest and writer

Fr. Jakub Deml
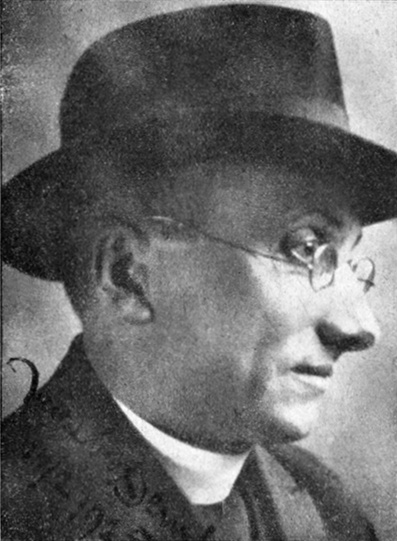
- Jakub Deml, 1928
- Born: 20 August 1878; Tasov, Austria-Hungary
- Died: 10 February 1961 (aged 82); Třebíč, Czechoslovakia
- Occupations: Priest, writer
- Writing career
- Language: Czech

Signature
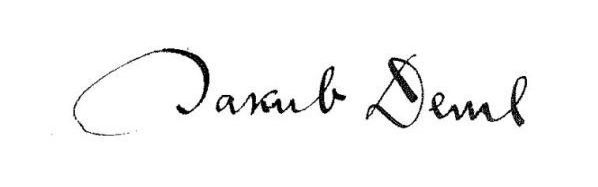

Jakub Deml (20 August 1878 – 10 February 1961) was a Czech Catholic priest and writer.

== Life ==
=== Childhood and youth ===
Jakub Deml was born in Tasov near Třebíč, Austria-Hungary, now the Czech Republic on 20 August 1878 as a firstborn child of a small store owner Jakub Deml and his second wife Antonie Demlová, born Bělochová. His grandfather, German Jan Deml, moved to Moravia from Opatov, near Moravská Třebová. In 1889 at the age of 11, Jakub was sent to a German family in Wulzeshofen near Laa in Austria where he learnt German. In the spring of 1890, Deml returned home due to his mother's serious illness and later death. Deml attended high school in Gymnázium Třebíč where he started to publish his first works in the journal Sursum. During the year 1897 Deml published his works in Zájmy lidu (Interest of people), and in 1899 in Nový život (New life), Dvacátý věk (Twentieth century) a Museo (Museum). After high school, Deml entered a seminary and in 1902 was ordained Roman Catholic priest.

=== Priesthood and early literary works ===
Deml's first post as a priest was in Kučerov by Vyškov. In 1905, Deml stopped publishing in Nový život (New life) and started to criticize catholic modernism and clericalism, which made him unpopular with many church representatives. His disputes with clergy and church authorities were slowly escalating also due to the slow implementation of the Decree of Pope Pius X. Finally for health reasons, Deml asked to be released from his duties and in 1907 retired from the priesthood. Bishop Pavel Huyn signed the release papers.

=== First republic ===
Deml put high hopes in the new republican order which started in Czechoslovakia in 1918. Unfortunately even then he was running into problems with bureaucracy. He was allowed to lead a Mass but was still prohibited from preaching and confessions. The year 1918 was important for Jakub Deml as he met with Pavla Kytlicová who became his promoter, later a publisher and a close friend. In 1922 Deml moved to his birthplace Tasov where he permanently settled. His house, designed by the famous architect Bohuslav Fuchs, served as his home until Deml's death. During the years of 1921 and 1928 Deml was a devoted member of Sokol. In 1924 Deml in one of his speeches attacked Orel, the organization competing with Sokol and for his comments was charged with slander. In his work Deml often criticized the Czechoslovak prezident Tomáš Garrigue Masaryk. His critiques eventually led to Deml's conflict with government officials and his work Šlépěje was confiscated. Deml's prosecution was finally stopped by the president himself. Later in life Deml stated that he valued president Tomáš Garrigue Masaryk, even though he disagreed with him on many points. The year 1929 was marked by the death of Otokar Březina. Deml's highly controversial work Mé svědectví o Otokaru Březinovi (My Testimony about O. Březina) had many antagonists and had a negative effect on Deml's popularity. In 1932 died Pavla Kytlicová, Deml's good friend, publisher, and supporter. That and Deml's troubling health strongly influenced his literary works from this time period. In 1934 Deml published one of his most famous novels Forgotten Light, which reflected the death of some of the closest figures in Deml's life. Again, it received very negative criticism. A year later Deml started corresponding with Marie Rosa Junová who became his publisher until the year 1948.

=== World War II ===
During the World War II Deml did not publish very much and between 1942 and 1945 could not publish at all. In early 1945 the Nazi army occupied Tasov looking for members of the partisan movement. The Nazi's captured several citizens of Tasov and kept them as hostages hoping to get information about the underground. Deml volunteered to be kept as a hostage instead of others, however shortly afterwards the Soviet Army freed the town and all hostages were released. After the war Deml was accused of collaboration with the Nazis, but for lack of evidence he was let go with a small conditional penalty. After 1948, Deml could not publish again.

=== Last years ===
In the 1950s Deml's works were yet again banned. Most of his works from this time period are in the form of letters or handwritten works. In January 1961 Deml had to be hospitalized. He was released after a short period but then was hospitalized again and died on 10 February 1961 in the Třebíč hospital.

== Main works ==
Deml became one of the most important Czech authors of the 1920s and 1930s. During his time his works were not very recognized, however he is now being considered a predecessor of modern literary genre, mainly surrealism.

Poetry

- Památný den v Kuksu, 1933 [Day to Remember in Kuks]
- Solitudo, 1934 [Solitude]
- Píseň vojína šílence, 193? [Song of an Insane Soldier]
- Princezna, 1935 [Princess]
- Jugo, 193?
- Moji přátelé, 1913 [My Friends]
- Miriam, 1916
- Věštec, 1917 [Oracle]
- Verše české, 1907–1938 [Czech poetry]
- Pupava, 1939 [Carline Thistle]
- Ustrnulými nebesy, 1946 [Through the Idle Sky]
- Stařec před jeslemi, 1955 [Old Man in Front of a Creche]
- Triptych, 1960
- Ledové květy, 1966 post mortem [Frosted Flowers]

Prose

- Hrad smrti, 1912 [Castle of Death]
- Pro budoucí poutníky a poutnice, 1913 [For Future Pilgrims]
- Tanec smrti, 1914 [Dance of Death]
- Šlépěje, 1917–1941 [Footprints]
- Česno, 1924 [Beehive]
- Tepna, 192? [Artery]
- Hlas mluví k slovu, 1926 [Voice Speaks to the Word]
- Mohyla, 1926 [Mound]
- Smrt Pavly Kytlicové, 1932 [Death of Pavla Kytlicová]
- Katolický sen, 1932 [Catholic Dream]
- Forgotten Light, 1934 [Forgotten Light]
- Rodný kraj, 1936 [Homeland]
- Vražda, 1937 [Murder]
- Ptačí budky, 1938 [Birdhouses]
- Podzimní sen, 1991 post mortem [Autumn Dream]

Essays

- Sokolská čítanka, 192? [Sokol's Reader]
- Sestrám, 1924 [For the Sisters]
- Dílo Felixe Jenewcina, 1928 [Works of Felix Jenewcin]

Diaries and Memoires

- Rosnička, 1912 [Tree frog]
- Domů, 1913 [Home]
- Mé svědectví o O. Březinovi, 1931 [My Testimony about O. Březina]

Notes

- Šlépěje, so-called 'One-Man-Review', Deml's own periodical with essays, poems, diary notes, letters, pamphlets, tractates etc., published between 1917 and 1941 in 26 volumes.
- Forgotten Light, published 1934 and confiscated by censors for 'obscene moments' – Roman Jakobson considered it the greatest prose work of the 1930s. It has not been translated to English yet. It was made into a film by Vladimír Michálek in 1996.
- Podzimní sen [Autumn Dream], written 1951, published in London 1984, first home edition Prague 1992.

== Gallery ==
Dedication

== Literature ==
- Alexander Wöll: Jakub Deml. Leben und Werk (1878–1961). Eine Studie zur mitteleuropäischen Literatur. Köln/Weimar/Wien: Böhlau, 2006 (in German with Czech quotations), ISBN 978-3-412-30005-0, ISBN 3-412-30005-5.
- Alois Plichta: O Jakubu Demlovi, Ve Vranově nad Dyjí: VOTOBIA, 1993, ISBN 978-80-85619-09-6, ISBN 80-85619-09-1.
- Jiří Olič: Čtení o Jakubu Demlovi, Olomouc: VOTOBIA, 1993, ISBN 978-80-85619-48-5, ISBN 80-85619-48-2. Biography of Jakub Deml.
- Miloš Dvořák: O Jakubu Demolovi, Praha: Cherm, 2007, ISBN 978-80-86370-29-3, ISBN 80-86370-29-1. Collection of studies and critiques about Deml's works by a Czech Catholic literature critic.
- Stanislav Vodička: Básník Jakub Deml v Tasově, Praha: Torst, 2001, ISBN 978-80-7215-131-8, ISBN 80-7215-131-2. Book of short prose gives a valuable testimony about Jakub Deml.
- Vladimír Binar: Čin a slovo – Kniha o Jakubu Demlovi, Prague, 2010, ISBN 978-80-87256-12-1. Collection of studies about Deml by a Czech literature historian. Includes Deml's complete bibliography.
