= Tasov =

Tasov may refer to places in the Czech Republic:

- Tasov (Hodonín District), a municipality and village in the South Moravian Region
- Tasov (Žďár nad Sázavou District), a municipality and village in the Vysočina Region
- Tašov, a municipality and village in the Ústí nad Labem Region
