= Oslava =

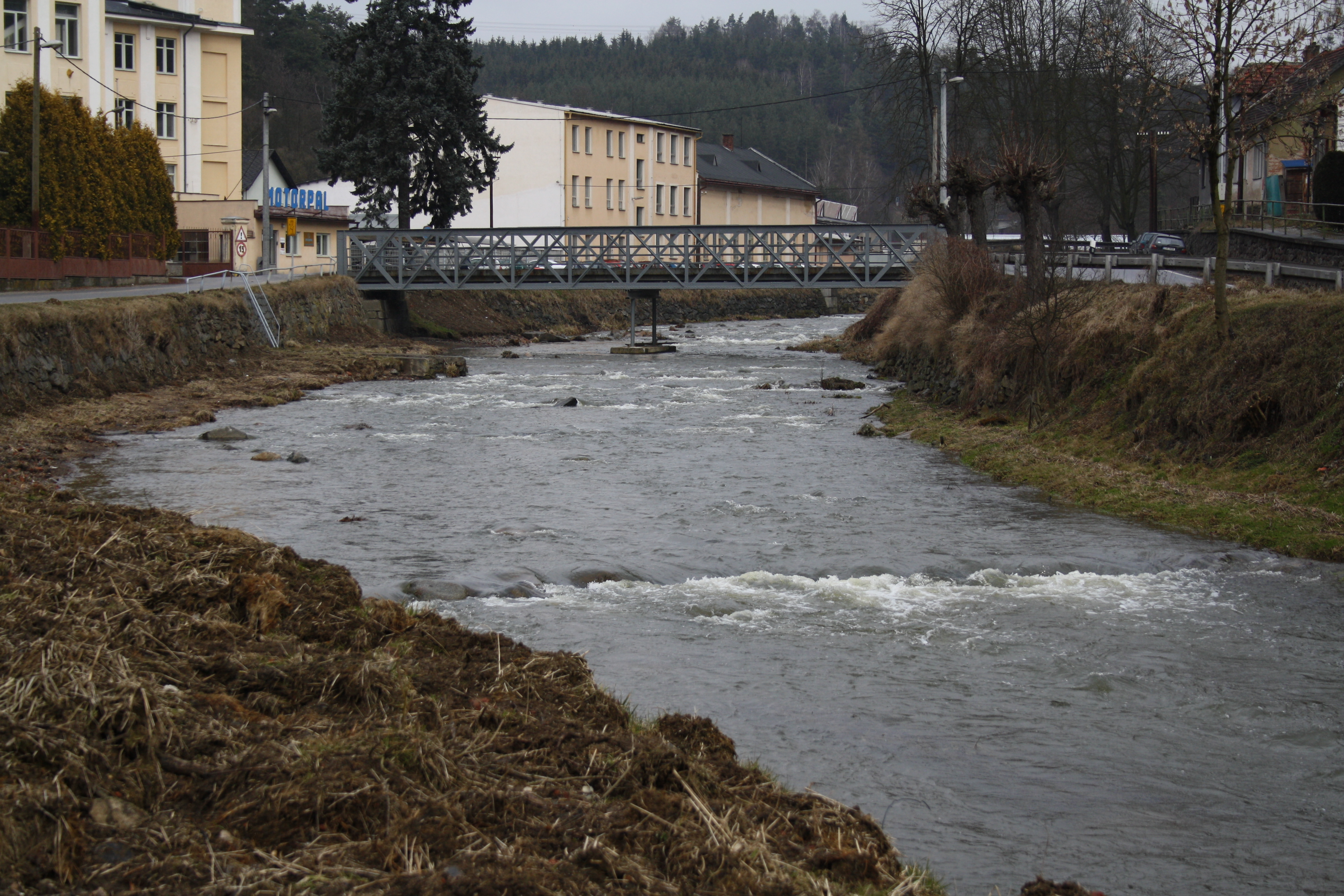
- The Oslava in Velké Meziříčí

Location
- Country: Czech Republic
- Regions: Vysočina; South Moravian

Physical characteristics
- Source
  - location: Matějov, Křižanov Highlands
  - coordinates: 49°33′3″N 15°53′57″E
  - elevation: 584 m (1,916 ft)
- Mouth
  - location: Jihlava
  - coordinates: 49°5′51″N 16°21′51″E
  - elevation: 205 m (673 ft)
- Length: 101.2 km (62.9 mi)
- Basin size: 867.0 km^{2} (334.8 sq mi)
- Discharge
  - average: 3.47 m^{3}/s (123 cu ft/s) near estuary

Basin features
- Progression: Jihlava→ Svratka→ Thaya→ Morava→ Danube→ Black Sea

The Oslava (Czech pronunciation: [ˈoslava]) is a river in the Czech Republic, a left tributary of the Jihlava River. It flows through the Vysočina and South Moravian regions. At 101.2 km (62.9 mi), it is the 24th longest river in the Czech Republic.

== Etymology ==
The first written mention of the river is from 1146, when it was called Ozlawa in a Latin text. According to one theory, the name is derived from the old Czech word osla, which meant 'grind' and referred to the stones suitable for grinding that were found in the river. According to another theory, the name comes from the Celtic (Gaelic) òs, òsa, meaning 'slow flowing water'.

== Characteristic ==
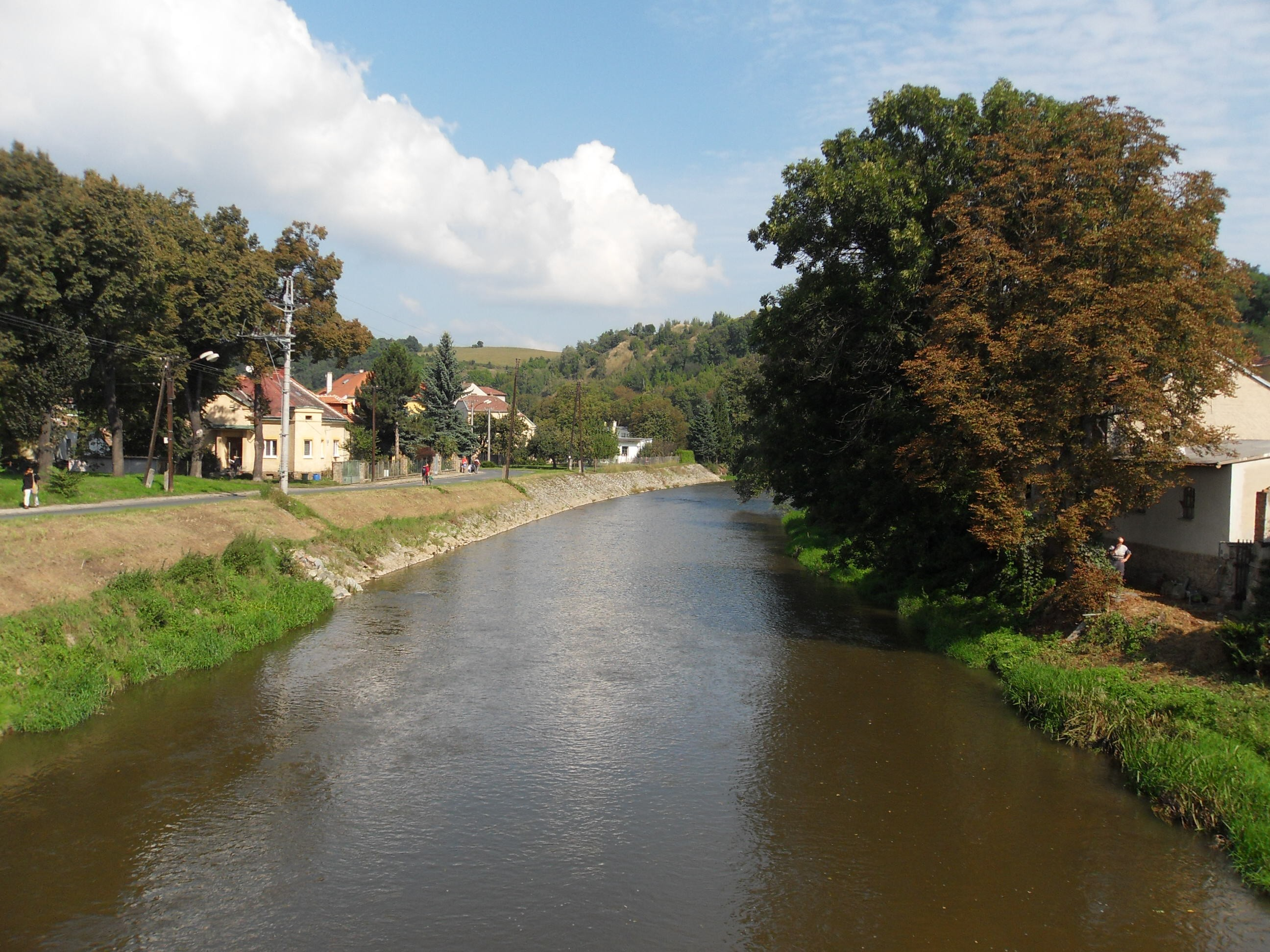
The Oslava in Oslavany

The Oslava originates in the territory of Matějov in the Křižanov Highlands at an elevation of 584 m (1,916 ft) and flows to Ivančice, where it enters the Jihlava River at an elevation of 205 m (673 ft). It is 101.2 km (62.9 mi) long, which makes it the 24th longest river in the Czech Republic. Before the remeasurement, its length was stated as 99.2 km until 2013 and then 99.6 km until 2021. After a survey by hydrologists, the location of the spring was specified according to the most abundant source and the length of the entire river was redefined. Its drainage basin has an area of 867.0 km^{2} (334.8 sq mi).

The longest tributaries of the Oslava are:

Tributary	Length (km)	River km	Side
Balinka	31.1	60.3	right
Chvojnice	21.0	17.6	left
Bohdalovský potok	17.0	83.0	right
Oslavička	15.1	58.1	right
Okarecký potok	13.0	32.6	right
Jasinka	12.8	39.4	left
Babačka	10.7	70.6	left
Polomina	10.4	47.3	left

== Course ==
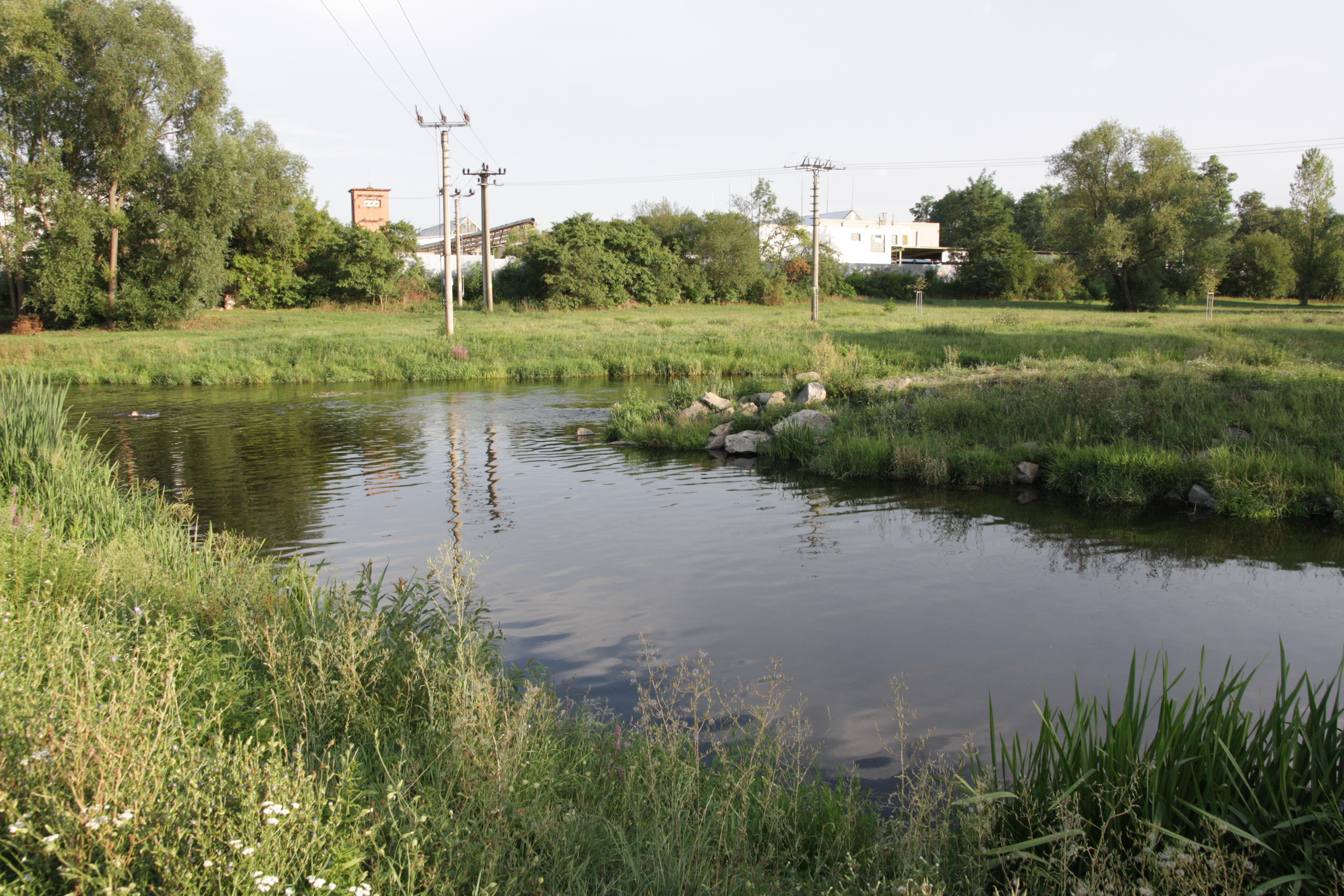
Confluence of the Oslava (in front) with the Jihlava

The largest town on the river is Velké Meziříčí. The river flows through the following settlements: Nové Veselí, Ostrov nad Oslavou, Velké Meziříčí, Náměšť nad Oslavou, Oslavany and Ivančice.

== Bodies of water ==
The Mostiště Reservoir with an area of 88 ha (220 acres) is constructed on the river and is the largest body of water in the basin area. A notable body of water is also the fishpond Veselský rybník with an area of 81 ha (200 acres).

== Fauna ==
There were recorded 16 species of aquatic molluscs in the Oslava river: 8 species of gastropods and 8 species of bivalves. There lives endangered species of bivalve Unio crassus at the lower river section.

== Tourism ==
The Oslava is suitable for river tourism. About 88 km of the river is navigable.
