= Tasovice (Blansko District) =

- Municipality
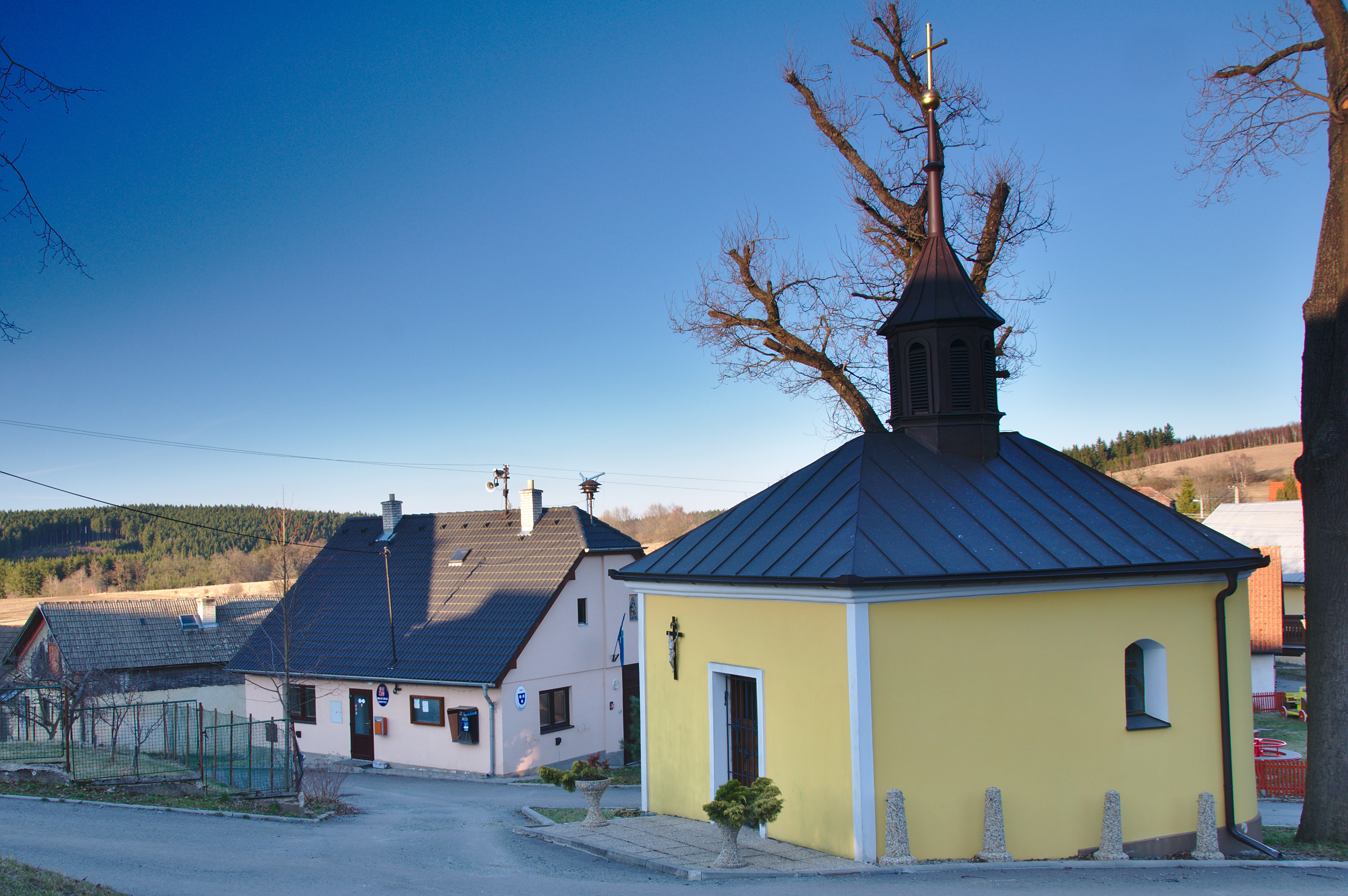
- Chapel of the Holy Trinity and municipal office

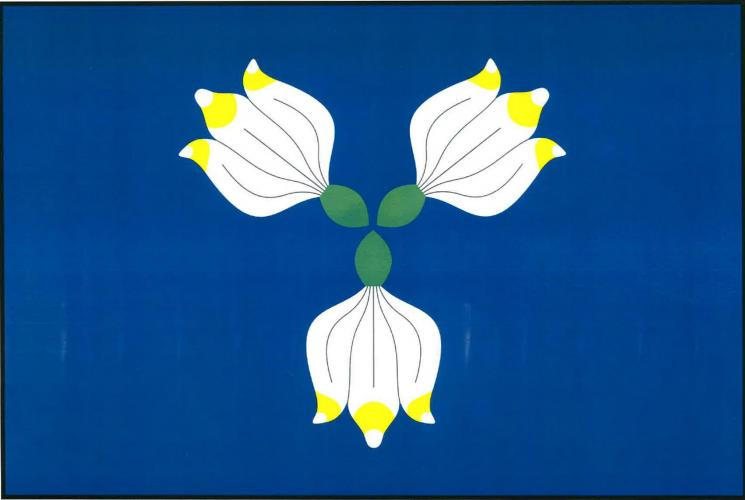
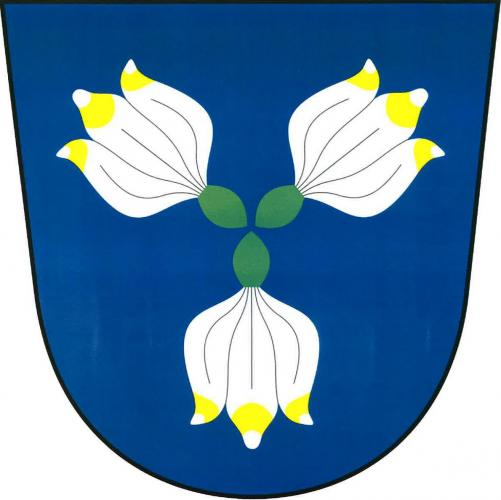
- Flag Coat of arms

- Location in the Czech Republic
- Coordinates: 49°29′46″N 16°26′30″E
- Country: Czech Republic
- Region: South Moravian
- District: Blansko
- First mentioned: 1406

Area
  - Total: 3.27 km^{2} (1.26 sq mi)
- Elevation: 635 m (2,083 ft)

Population (2026-01-01)
  - Total: 73
  - Density: 22/km^{2} (58/sq mi)
- Time zone: UTC+1 (CET)
  - Summer (DST): UTC+2 (CEST)
- Postal code: 679 71
- Website: www.obec-tasovice.cz

Tasovice is a municipality and village in Blansko District in the South Moravian Region of the Czech Republic. It has about 70 inhabitants.

Tasovice lies approximately 21 kilometres (13 mi) north-west of Blansko, 36 km (22 mi) north of Brno, and 160 km (99 mi) south-east of Prague.

== Demographics ==
Historical population
Year	Pop.	±%
1869	333	—
1880	351	+5.4%
1890	307	−12.5%
1900	322	+4.9%
1910	306	−5.0%
1921	312	+2.0%
1930	261	−16.3%
1950	167	−36.0%
1961	188	+12.6%
1970	152	−19.1%
1980	111	−27.0%
1991	78	−29.7%
2001	75	−3.8%
2011	77	+2.7%
2021	71	−7.8%
Source: Censuses
