= Křižanov Highlands =

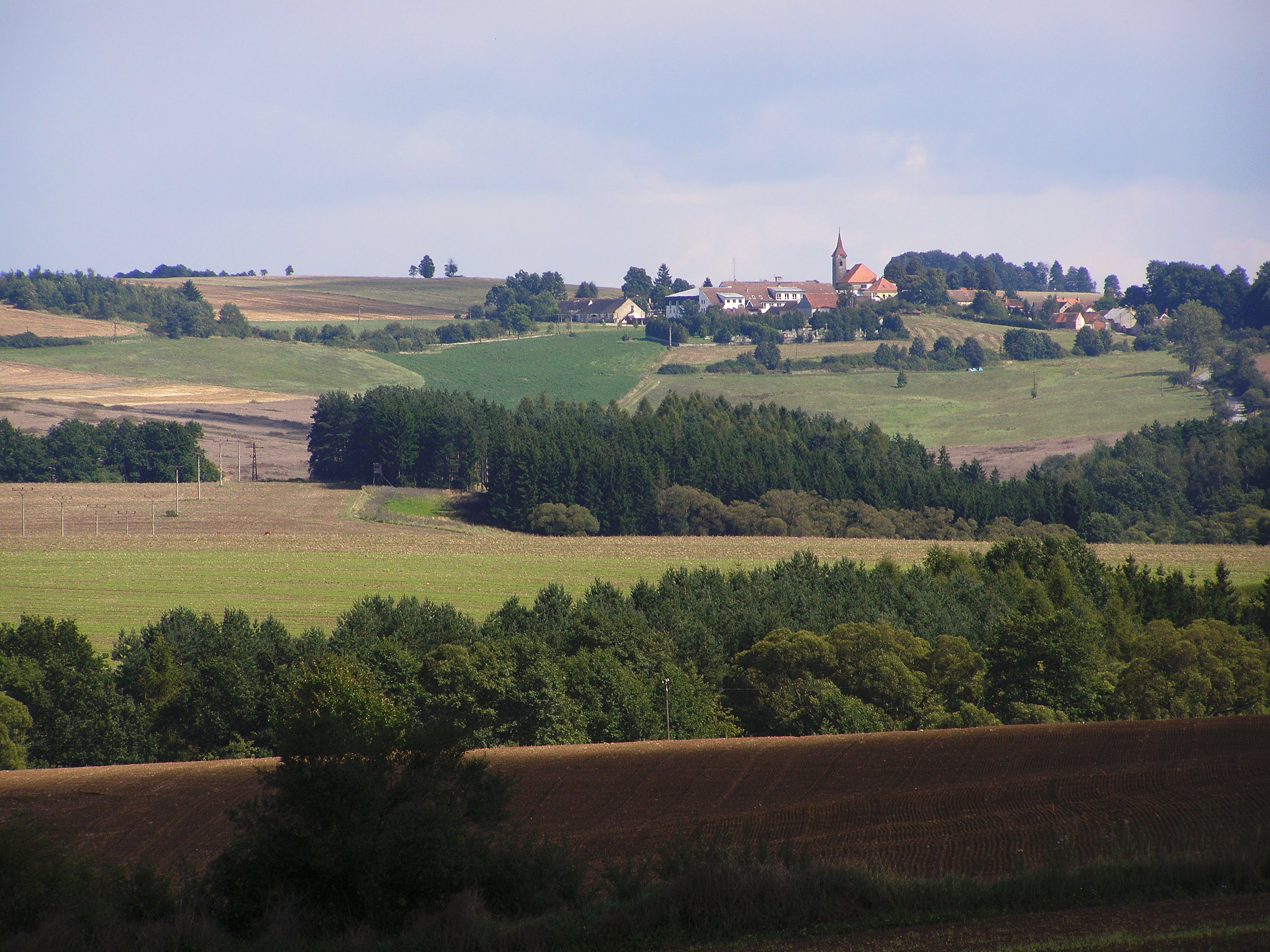
- Staré Hobzí surrounding

Highest point
- Peak: Harusův kopec
- Elevation: 741 m (2,431 ft)

Dimensions
- Area: 2,722 km^{2} (1,051 mi^{2})

Geography
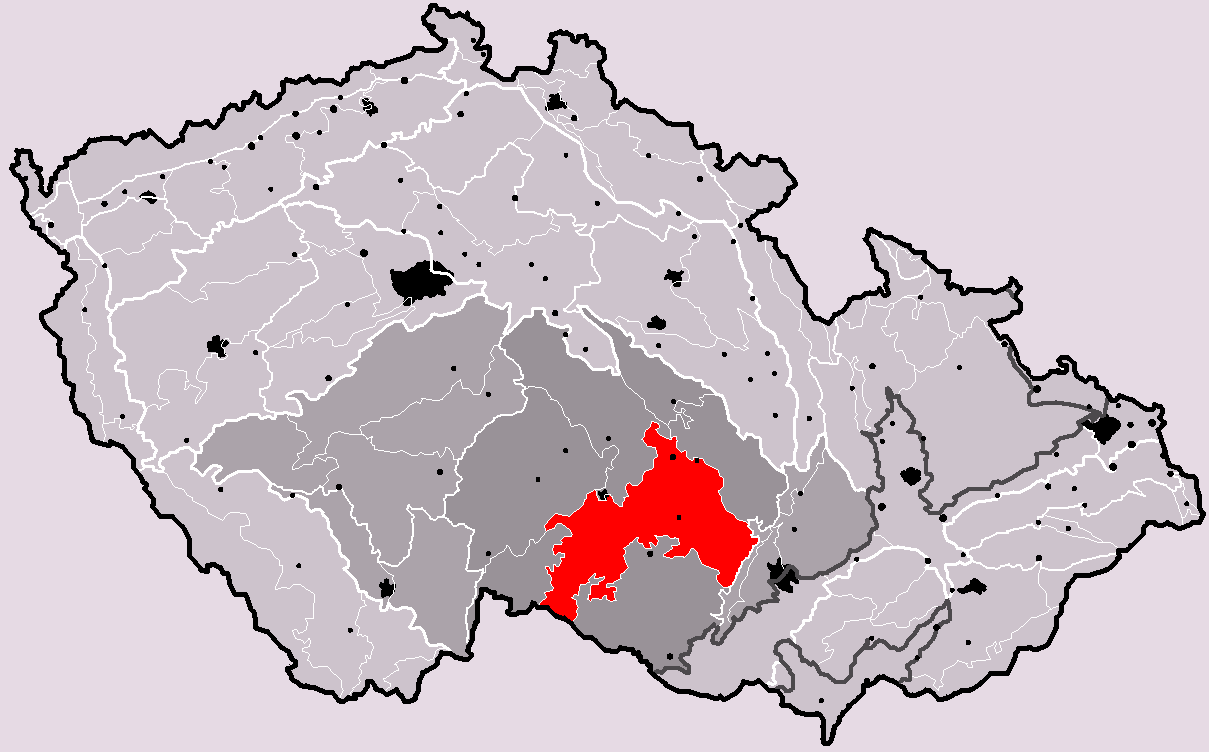
- Křižanov Highlands in the geomorphological system of the Czech Republic
- Country: Czech Republic
- Region: Vysočina
- Range coordinates: 49°20′46″N 16°10′59″E
- Parent range: Bohemian-Moravian Highlands

Geology
- Orogeny: Variscan
- Rock age(s): Paleozoic, Mesozoic
- Rock type(s): Migmatite, Quartz slate

The Křižanov Highlands (Czech: Křižanovská vrchovina, German: Krischanauer Bergland) is a highland and a geomorphological mesoregion of the Czech Republic. It is located mostly in the Vysočina Region.

== Geomorphology ==
The Křižanov Highlands is a mesoregion of the Bohemian-Moravian Highlands within the Bohemian Massif. It borders other mesoregions of the Bohemian-Moravian Highlands.

The highest peaks are Harusův kopec at 741 metres (2,431 ft) above sea level, Špičák at 734 metres (2,408 ft), Mařenka at 711 metres (2,333 ft), Ještěnice at 710 metres (2,330 ft), Havlína at 706 metres (2,316 ft), and Kyjov at 703 metres (2,306 ft).

== Geology ==
The highlands, together with the Upper Svratka Highlands and Jevišovice Uplands threshold, form the Western-Moravian part of Moldanubian Zone.

== Pedology ==
The primary composition of the range is migmatite, granite and gneis. Soil horizon is mainly fluvisol and cambisol.

== Geography ==
The area has a horseshoe shape that extends from Tišnov in the east, to Žďár nad Sázavou in the northwest and Jemnice in the southwest. The highlands have an area of 2,722 square kilometres (1,051 sq mi) and an average height of 536 metres (1,759 ft).

The rivers that originates here include Jihlava, Oslava, and Thaya.

The most populated settlements in the territory are Jihlava (smaller part), Žďár nad Sázavou, Velké Meziříčí, Nové Město na Moravě, Dačice, Třešť, and Velká Bíteš.

== Vegetation ==
The mountain range is 47% forested, plantations only – spruces, limes, maples, birches.

== Gallery ==
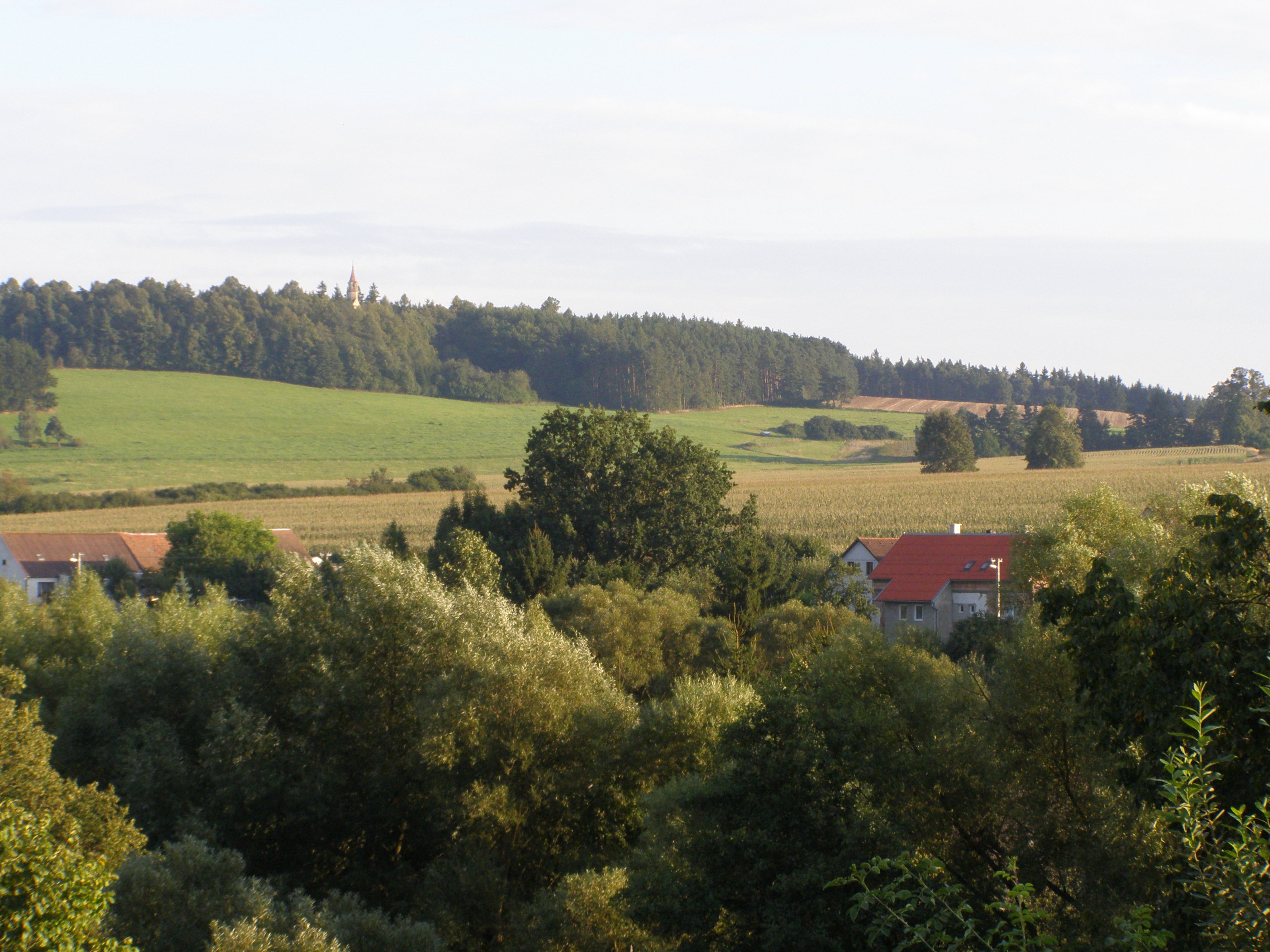
Monserrat nearby Cizkrajov

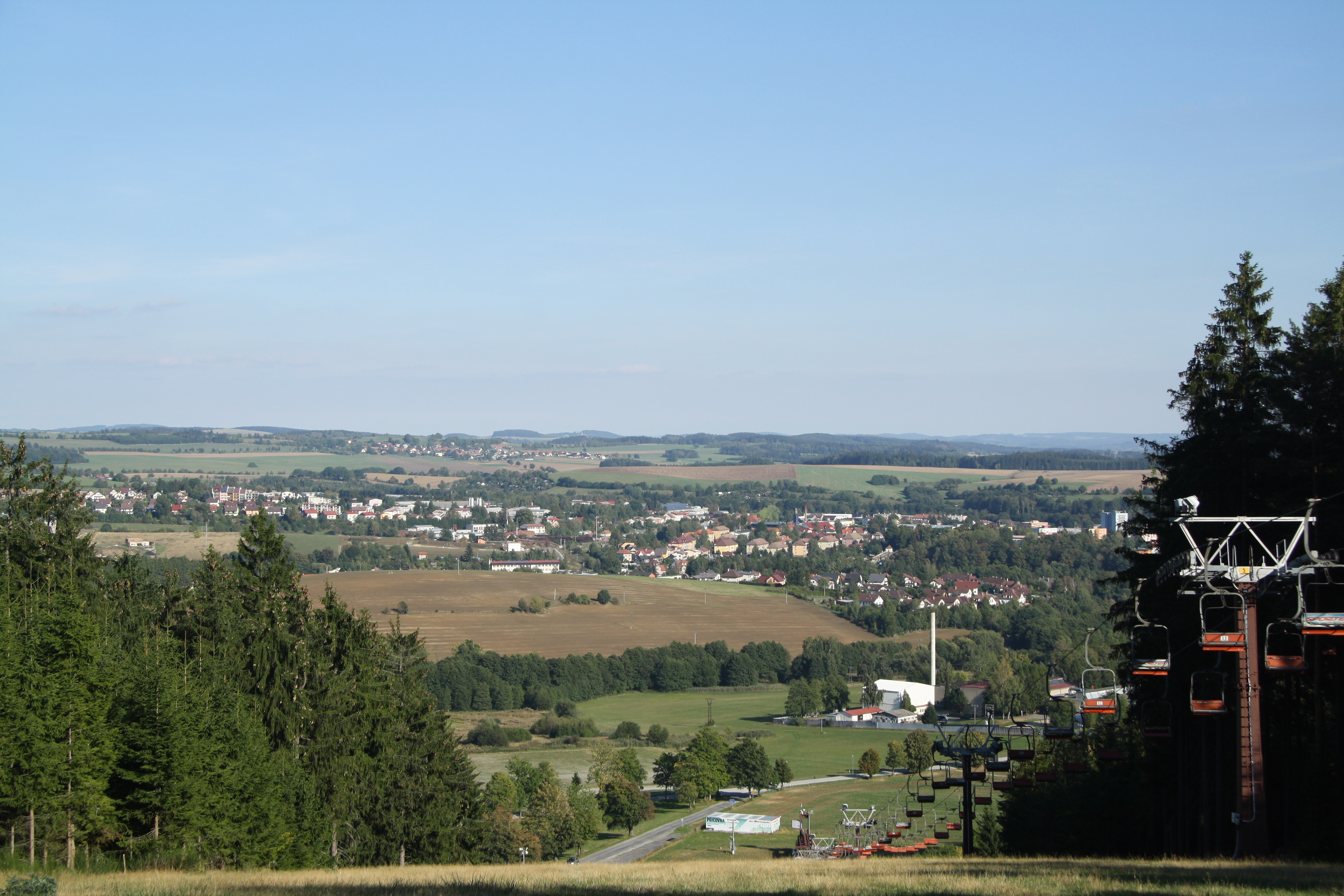
View from Harusův kopec

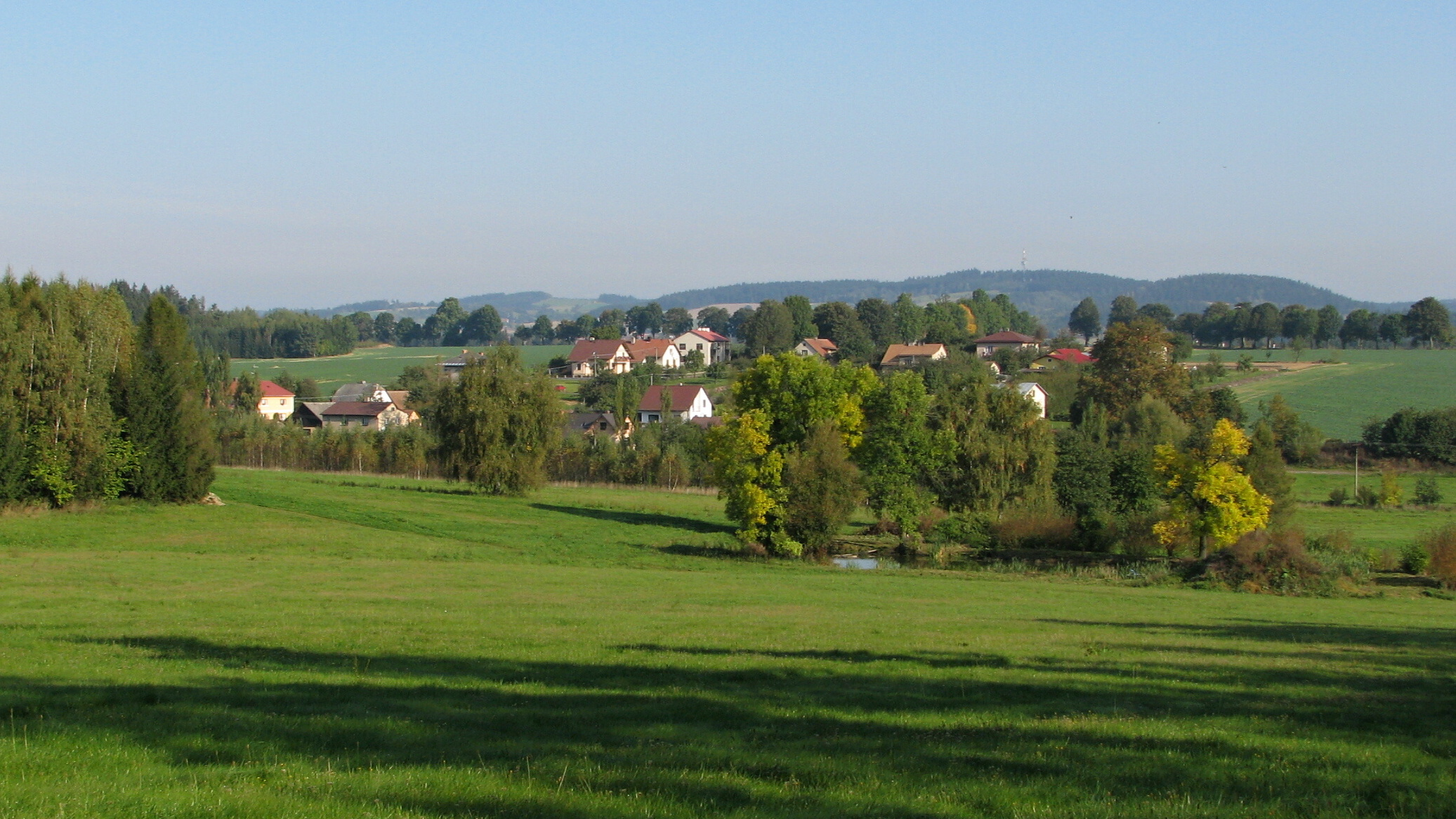
Hlinné

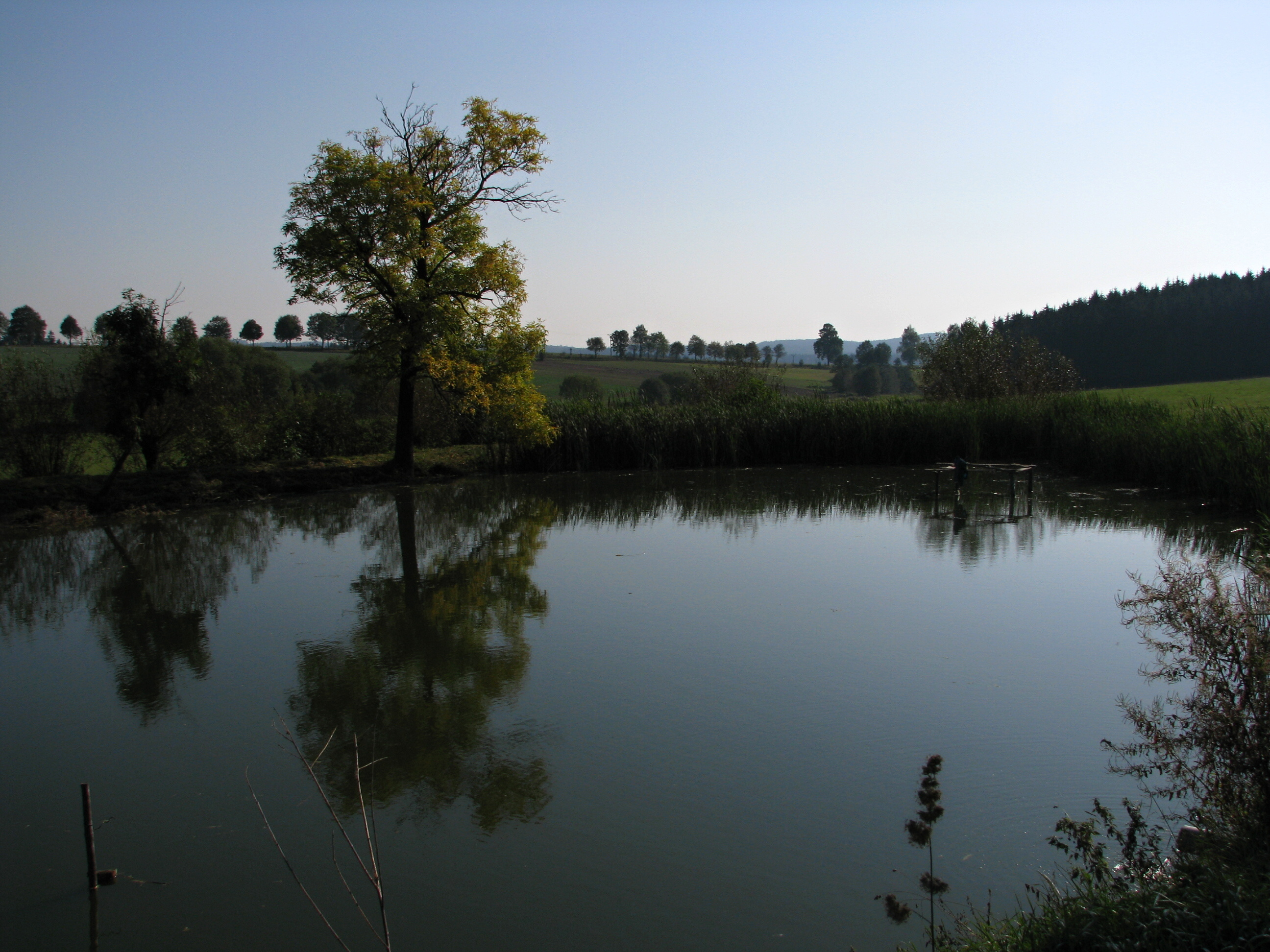
Hlinné pond

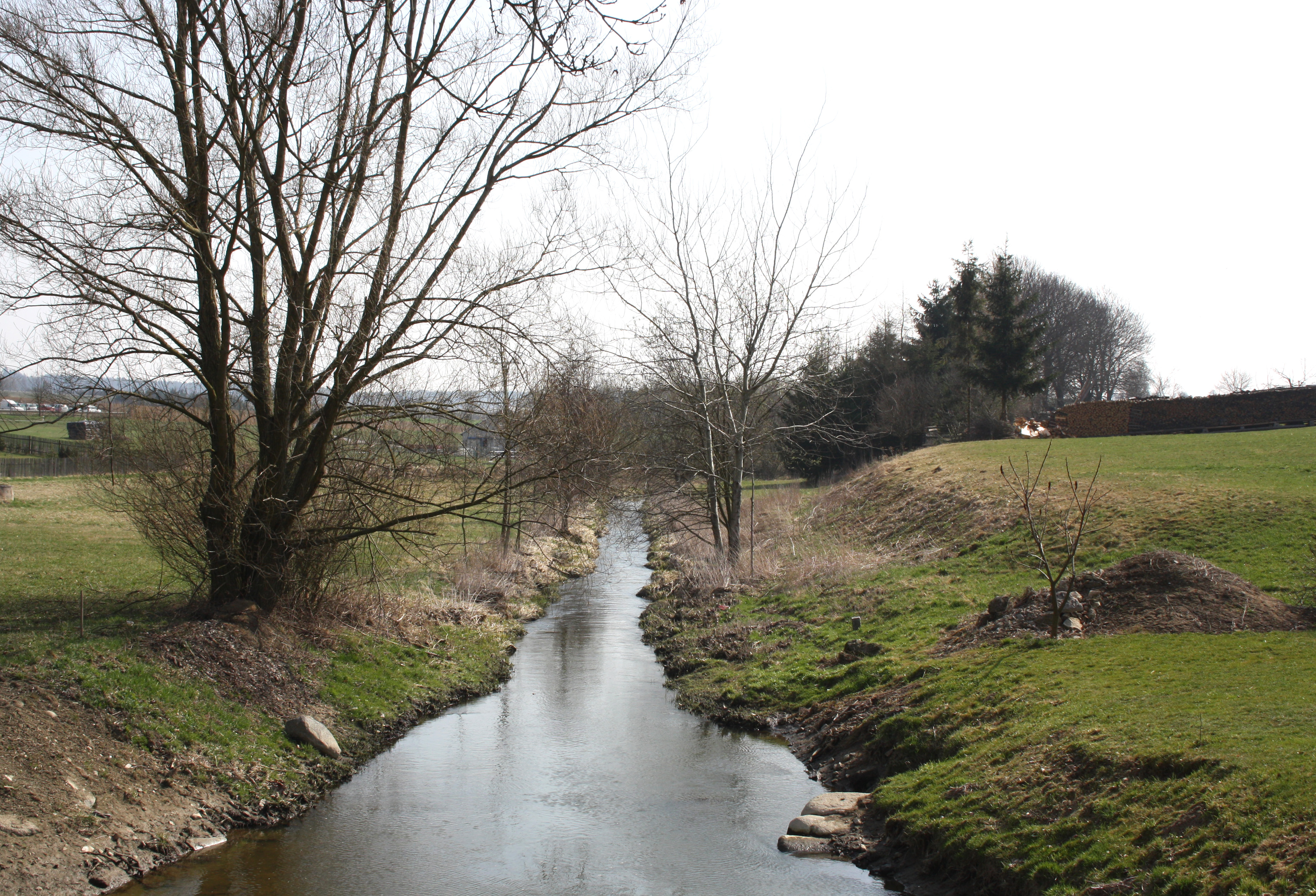
Balinka stream

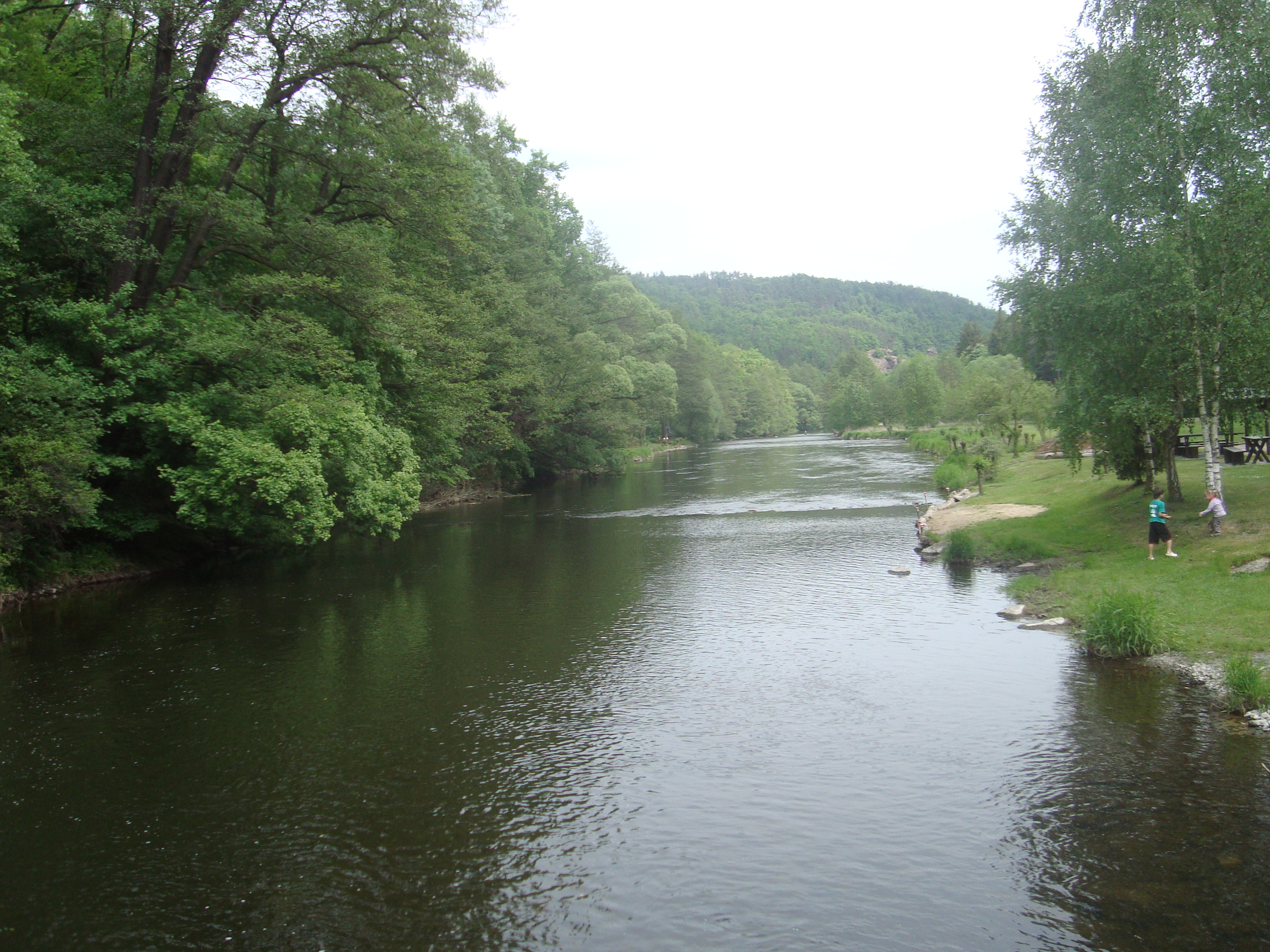
Jihlava river

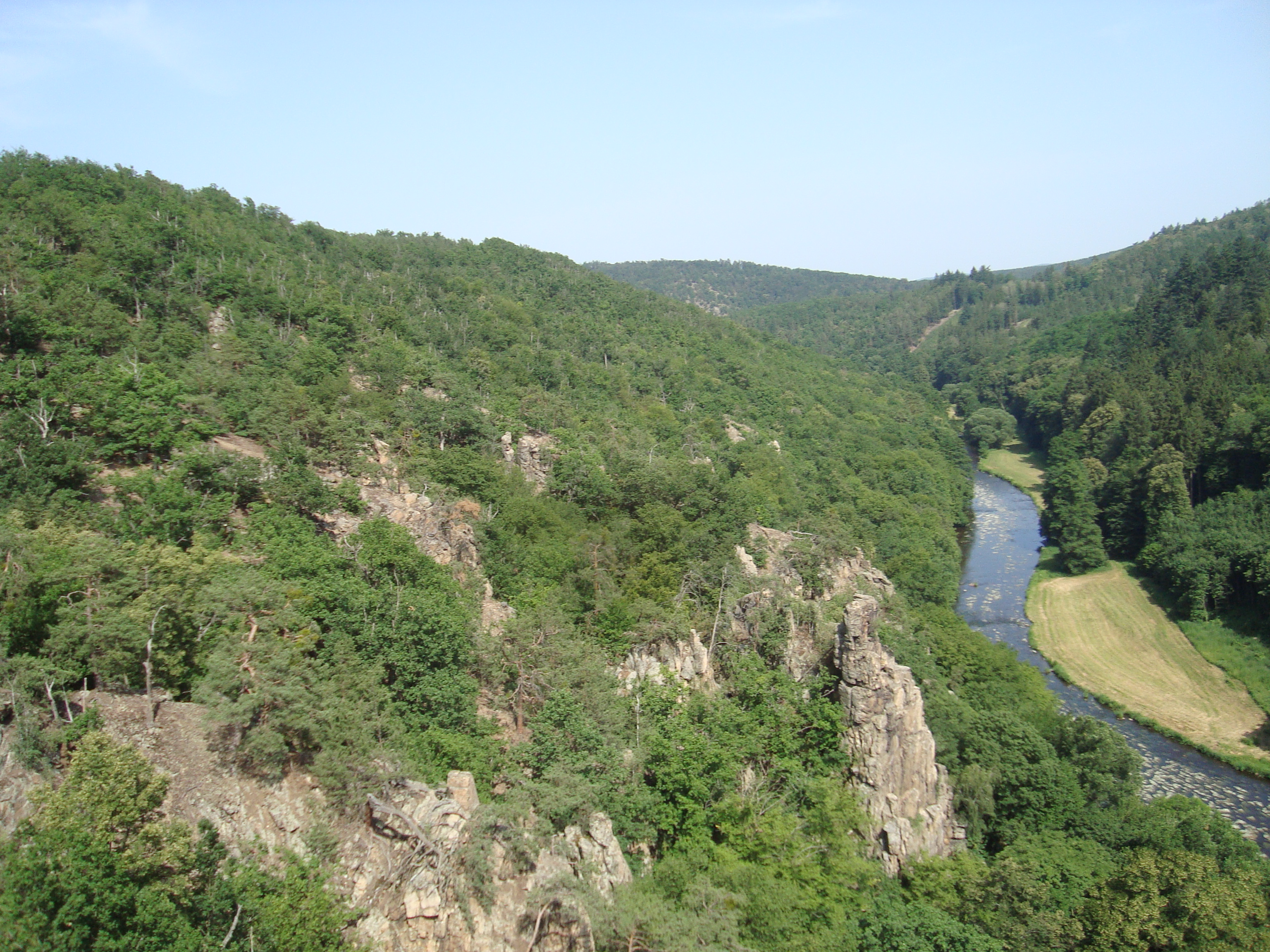
Middle Jihlava canyon

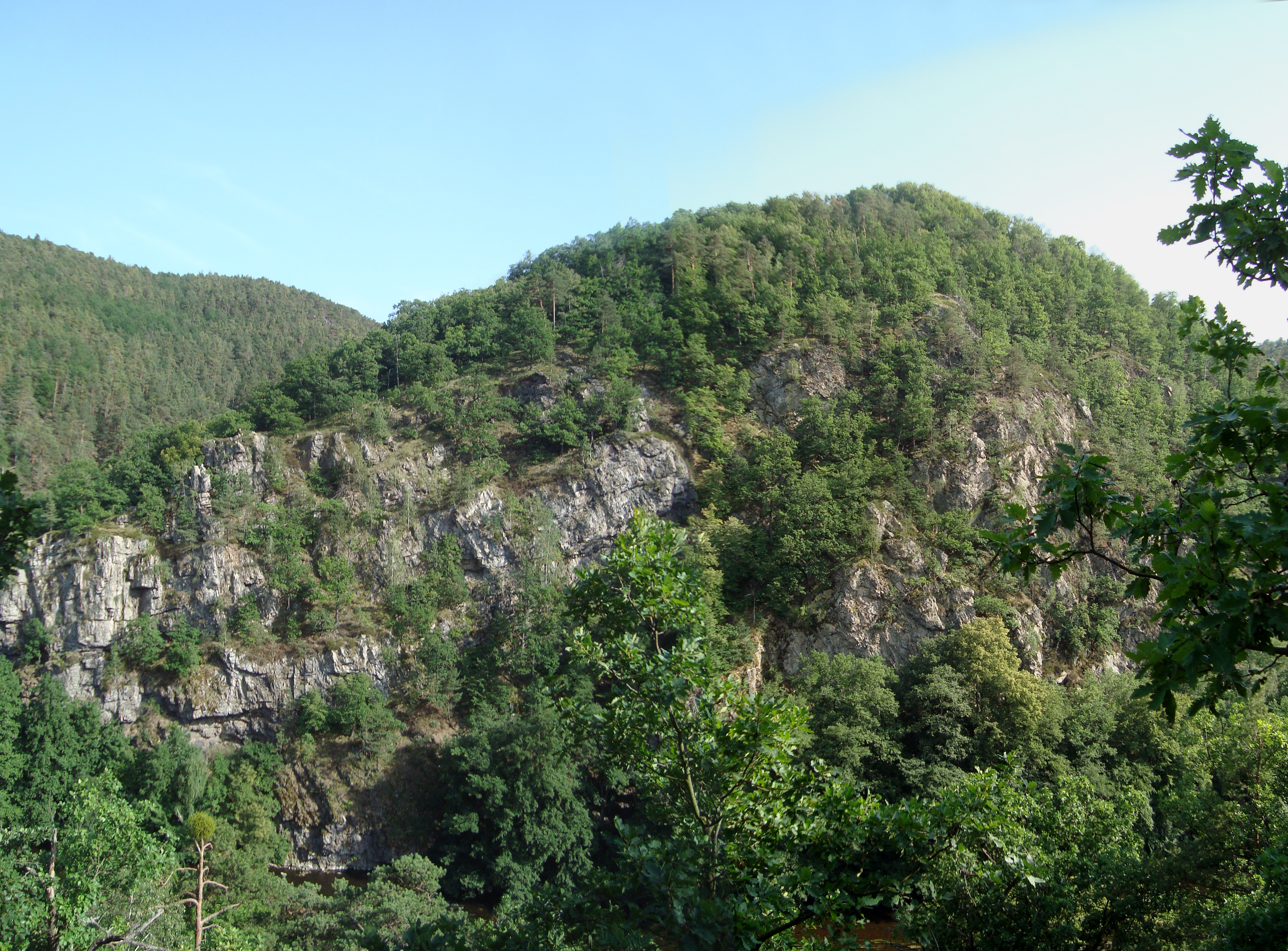
Middle Jihlava canyon (Velká skála)
