= Velké Tresné =

- Municipality
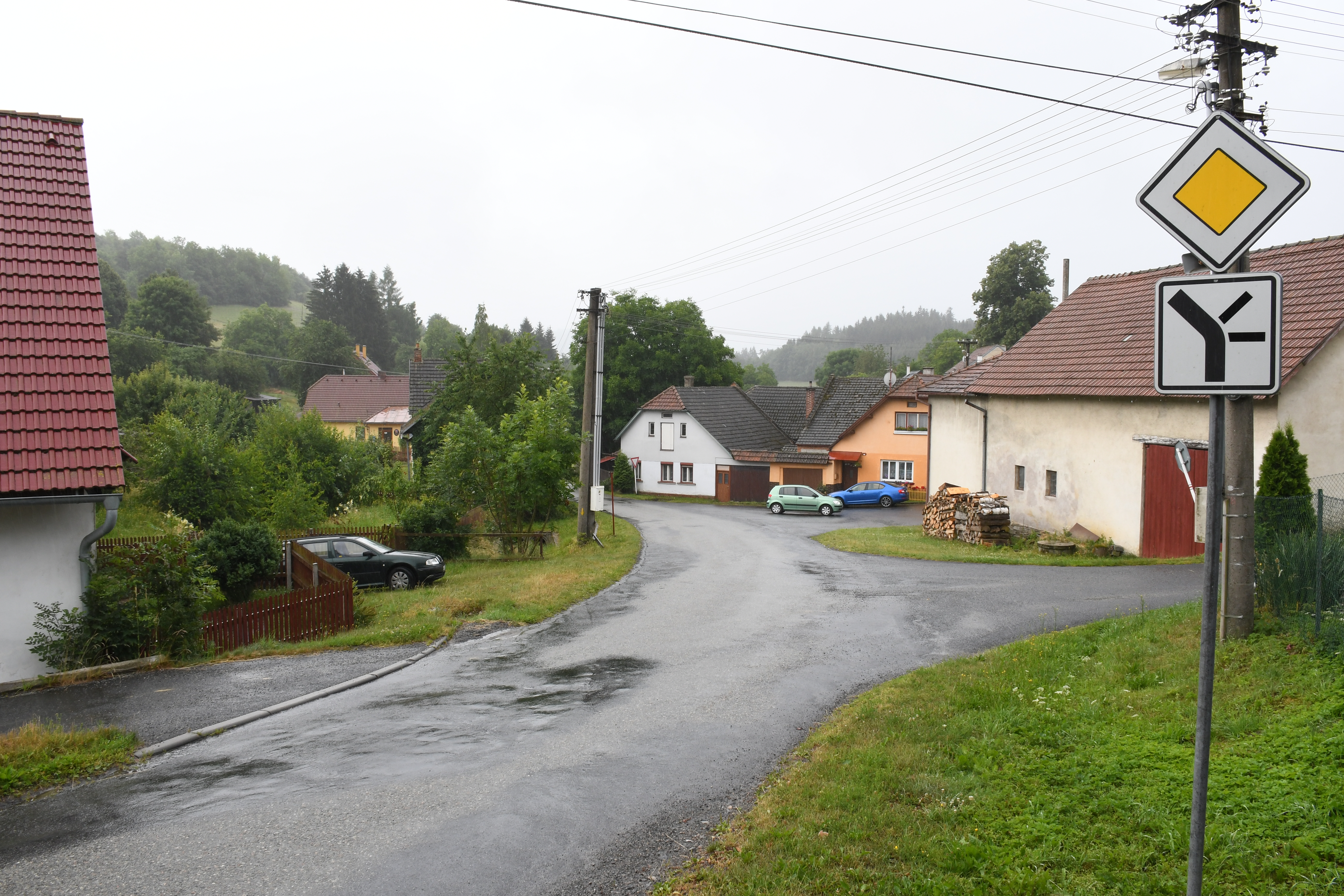
- Main road

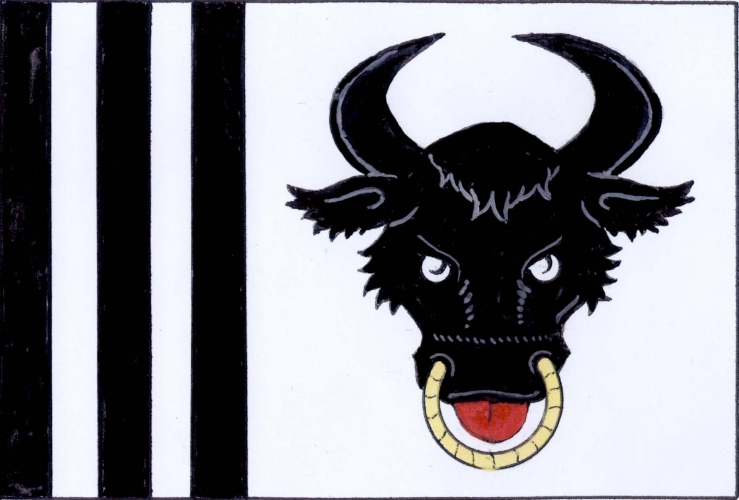
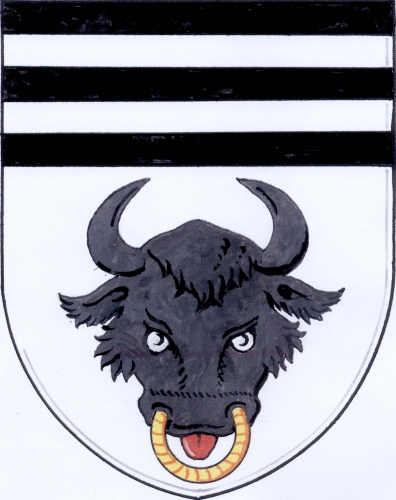
- Flag Coat of arms

- Location in the Czech Republic
- Coordinates: 49°34′31″N 16°22′50″E
- Country: Czech Republic
- Region: Vysočina
- District: Žďár nad Sázavou
- First mentioned: 1351

Area
  - Total: 2.77 km^{2} (1.07 sq mi)
- Elevation: 564 m (1,850 ft)

Population (2026-01-01)
  - Total: 98
  - Density: 35/km^{2} (92/sq mi)
- Time zone: UTC+1 (CET)
  - Summer (DST): UTC+2 (CEST)
- Postal code: 592 65
- Website: www.velketresne.cz

Velké Tresné is a municipality and village in Žďár nad Sázavou District in the Vysočina Region of the Czech Republic. It has about 100 inhabitants.

Velké Tresné lies approximately 33 kilometres (21 mi) east of Žďár nad Sázavou, 61 km (38 mi) east of Jihlava, and 152 km (94 mi) east of Prague.

== Demographics ==
Historical population
Year	Pop.	±%
1869	215	—
1880	247	+14.9%
1890	261	+5.7%
1900	248	−5.0%
1910	252	+1.6%
1921	243	−3.6%
1930	216	−11.1%
1950	233	+7.9%
1961	246	+5.6%
1970	237	−3.7%
1980	188	−20.7%
1991	165	−12.2%
2001	126	−23.6%
2011	119	−5.6%
2021	106	−10.9%
Source: Censuses
