= Dankovice =

Dankovice may refer to:

- Daňkovice, a municipality and village in the Czech Republic
- Dankoviće, a village in Serbia
