= Daňkovice =

- Municipality
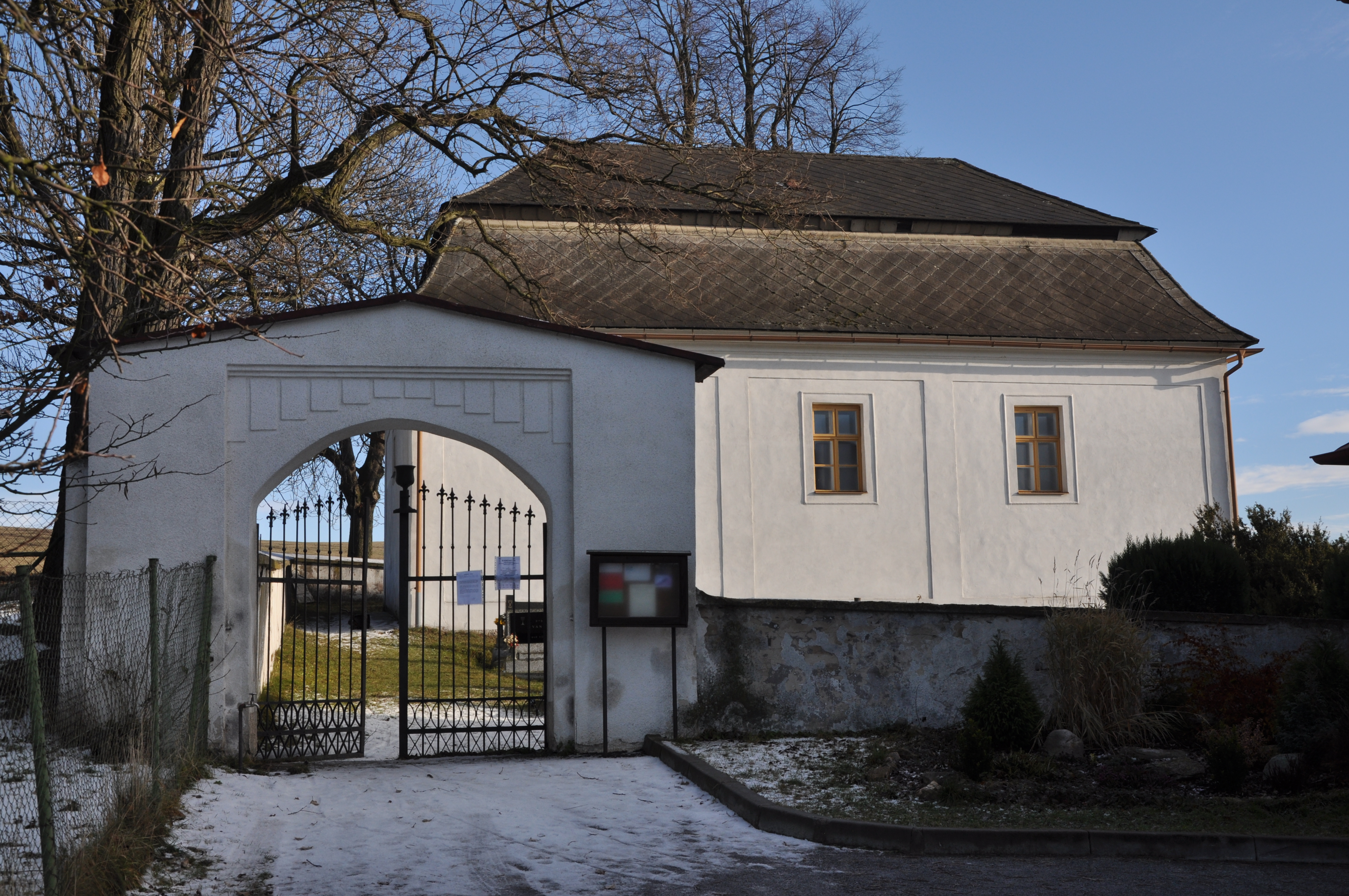
- Evangelic church

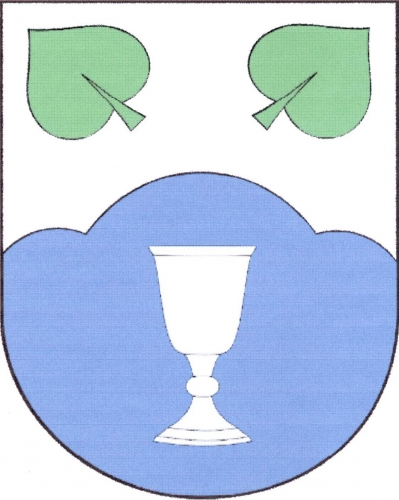
- Flag Coat of arms

- Location in the Czech Republic
- Coordinates: 49°39′14″N 16°8′55″E
- Country: Czech Republic
- Region: Vysočina
- District: Žďár nad Sázavou
- First mentioned: 1350

Area
  - Total: 3.02 km^{2} (1.17 sq mi)
- Elevation: 685 m (2,247 ft)

Population (2026-01-01)
  - Total: 177
  - Density: 58.6/km^{2} (152/sq mi)
- Time zone: UTC+1 (CET)
  - Summer (DST): UTC+2 (CEST)
- Postal code: 592 03
- Website: www.dankovice.cz

Daňkovice is a municipality and village in Žďár nad Sázavou District in the Vysočina Region of the Czech Republic. It has about 200 inhabitants.

Daňkovice lies approximately 18 kilometres (11 mi) north-east of Žďár nad Sázavou, 50 km (31 mi) north-east of Jihlava, and 133 km (83 mi) east of Prague.

== Demographics ==
Historical population
Year	Pop.	±%
1869	351	—
1880	358	+2.0%
1890	318	−11.2%
1900	344	+8.2%
1910	356	+3.5%
1921	342	−3.9%
1930	310	−9.4%
1950	441	+42.3%
1961	209	−52.6%
1970	218	+4.3%
1980	206	−5.5%
1991	182	−11.7%
2001	141	−22.5%
2011	144	+2.1%
2021	154	+6.9%
Source: Censuses
