= Petráveč =

- Municipality
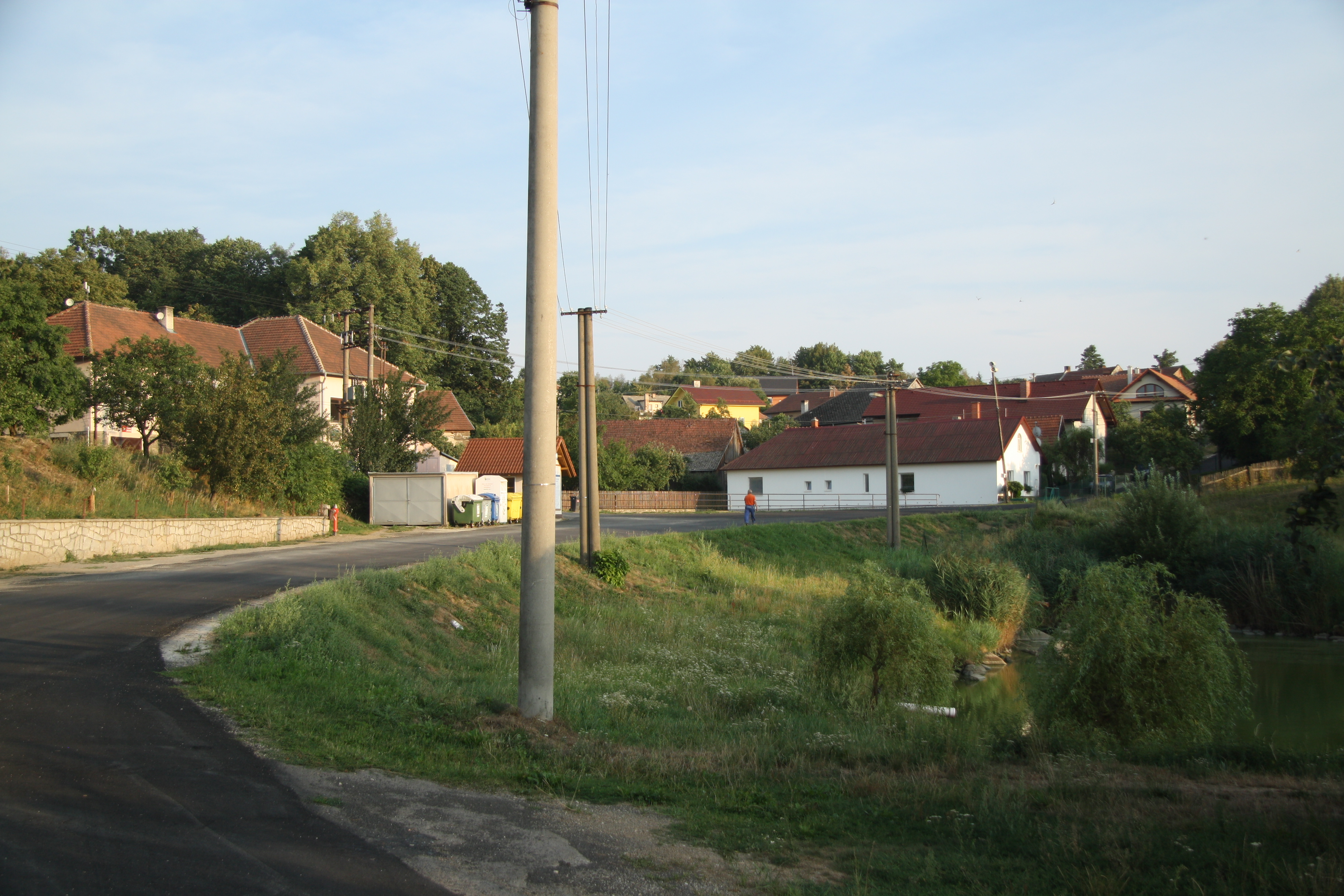
- Centre of Petráveč

- Flag Coat of arms

- Location in the Czech Republic
- Coordinates: 49°19′39″N 16°2′28″E
- Country: Czech Republic
- Region: Vysočina
- District: Žďár nad Sázavou
- First mentioned: 1456

Area
  - Total: 3.68 km^{2} (1.42 sq mi)
- Elevation: 485 m (1,591 ft)

Population (2026-01-01)
  - Total: 305
  - Density: 82.9/km^{2} (215/sq mi)
- Time zone: UTC+1 (CET)
  - Summer (DST): UTC+2 (CEST)
- Postal code: 594 01
- Website: petravec.cz

Petráveč is a municipality and village in Žďár nad Sázavou District in the Vysočina Region of the Czech Republic. It has about 300 inhabitants.

== Demographics ==
Historical population
Year	Pop.	±%
1869	109	—
1880	126	+15.6%
1890	155	+23.0%
1900	153	−1.3%
1910	136	−11.1%
1921	134	−1.5%
1930	142	+6.0%
1950	126	−11.3%
1961	112	−11.1%
1970	114	+1.8%
1980	146	+28.1%
1991	165	+13.0%
2001	173	+4.8%
2011	171	−1.2%
2021	295	+72.5%
Source: Censuses
