= Skorkov =

Skorkov may refer to places in the Czech Republic:

- Skorkov (Havlíčkův Brod District), a municipality and village in the Vysočina Region
- Skorkov (Mladá Boleslav District), a municipality and village in the Central Bohemian Region
