= Olešenka =

- Municipality
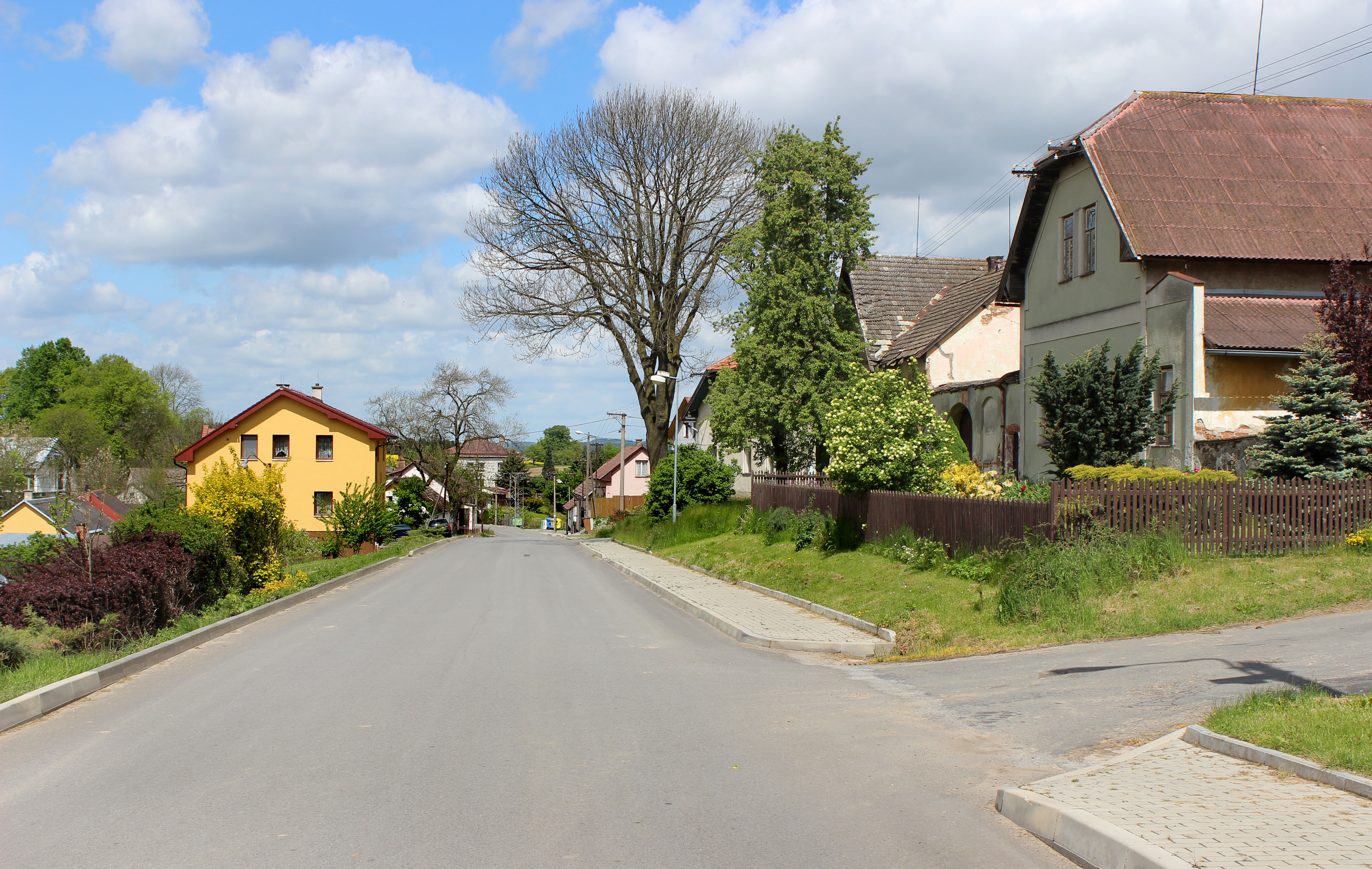
- Main street

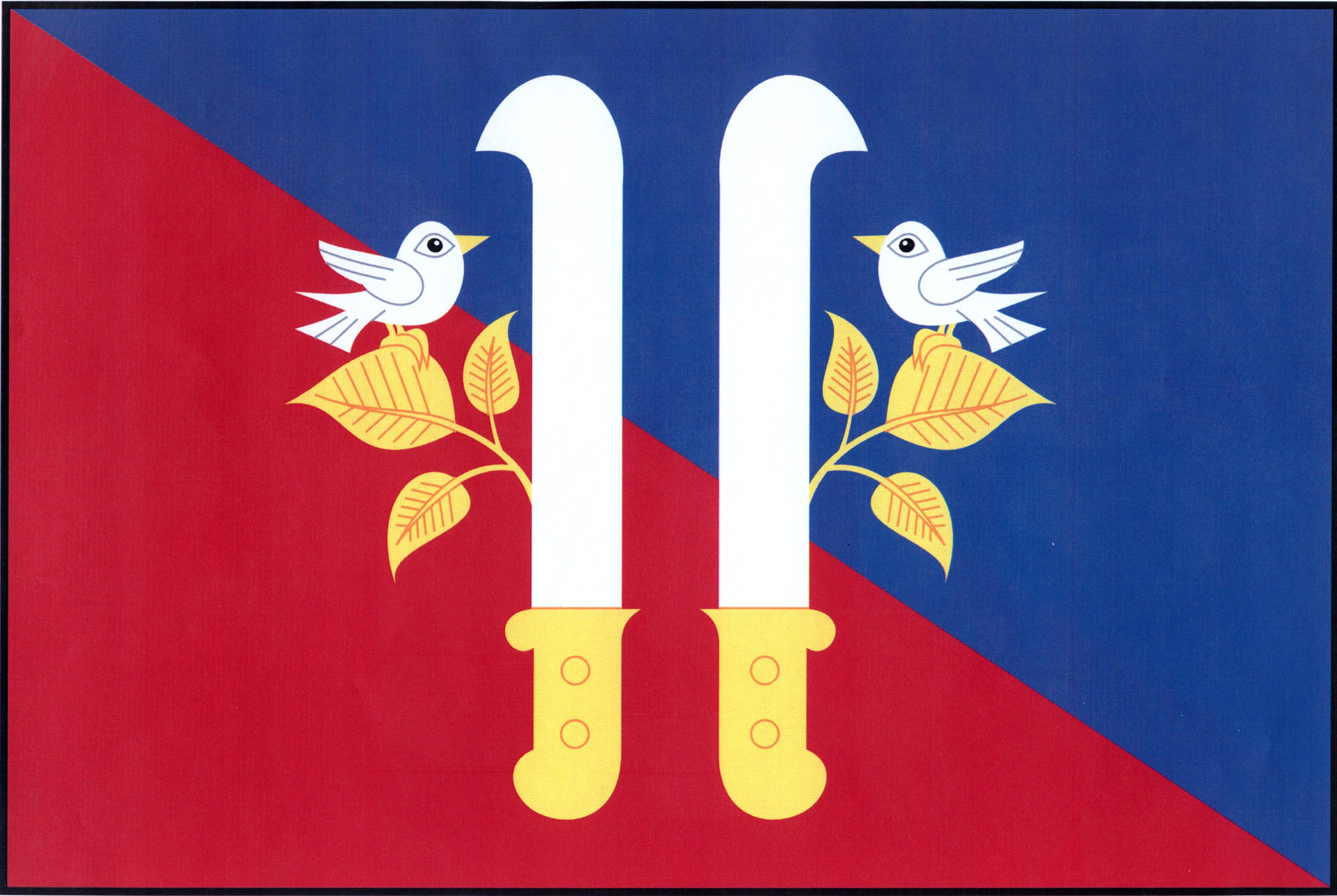
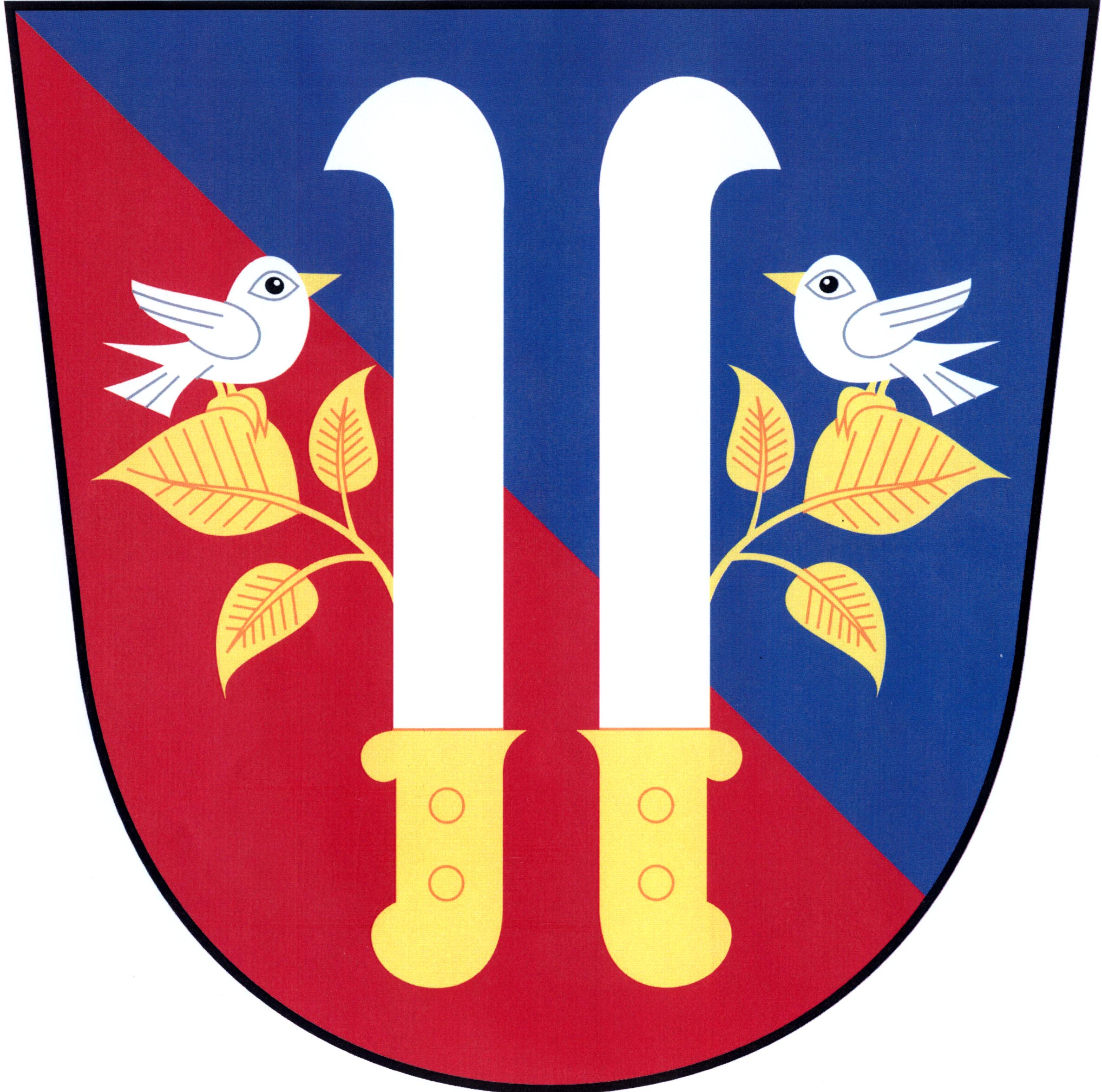
- Flag Coat of arms

- Location in the Czech Republic
- Coordinates: 49°32′56″N 15°45′57″E
- Country: Czech Republic
- Region: Vysočina
- District: Havlíčkův Brod
- First mentioned: 1356

Area
  - Total: 6.85 km^{2} (2.64 sq mi)
- Elevation: 530 m (1,740 ft)

Population (2026-01-01)
  - Total: 187
  - Density: 27.3/km^{2} (70.7/sq mi)
- Time zone: UTC+1 (CET)
  - Summer (DST): UTC+2 (CEST)
- Postal code: 582 22
- Website: www.olesenka.cz

Olešenka is a municipality and village in Havlíčkův Brod District in the Vysočina Region of the Czech Republic. It has about 200 inhabitants.

== Demographics ==
Historical population
Year	Pop.	±%
1869	309	—
1880	336	+8.7%
1890	334	−0.6%
1900	311	−6.9%
1910	302	−2.9%
1921	314	+4.0%
1930	293	−6.7%
1950	236	−19.5%
1961	237	+0.4%
1970	213	−10.1%
1980	191	−10.3%
1991	197	+3.1%
2001	189	−4.1%
2011	183	−3.2%
2021	192	+4.9%
Source: Censuses
