= Druhanov =

- Municipality
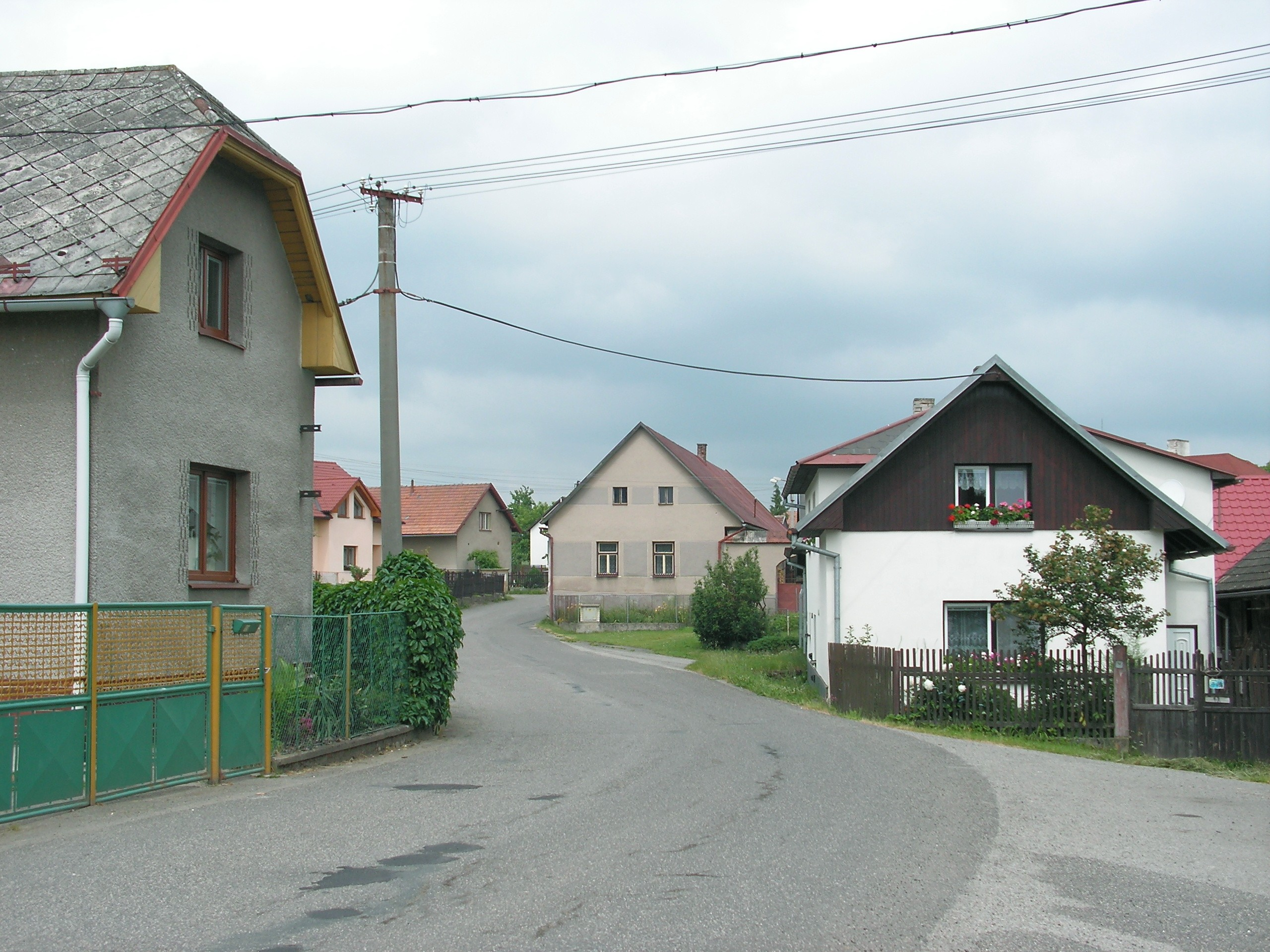
- Main street

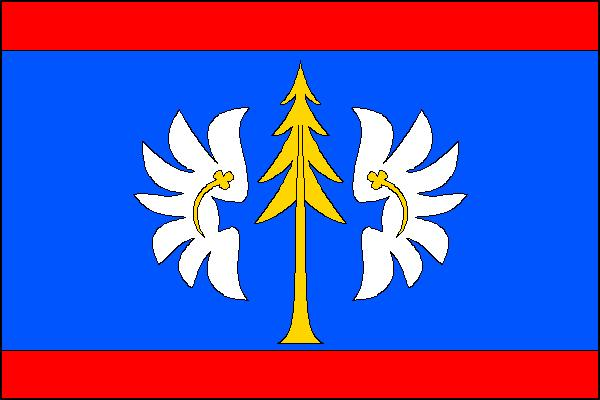
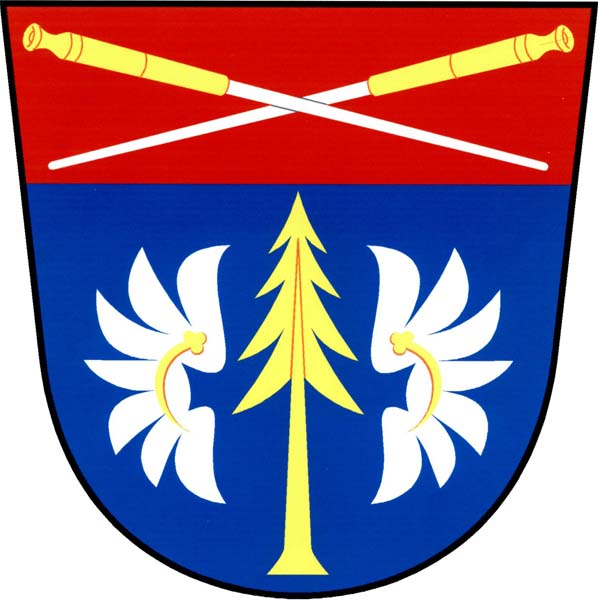
- Flag Coat of arms

- Location in the Czech Republic
- Coordinates: 49°41′56″N 15°24′37″E
- Country: Czech Republic
- Region: Vysočina
- District: Havlíčkův Brod
- First mentioned: 1362

Area
  - Total: 3.91 km^{2} (1.51 sq mi)
- Elevation: 496 m (1,627 ft)

Population (2026-01-01)
  - Total: 159
  - Density: 40.7/km^{2} (105/sq mi)
- Time zone: UTC+1 (CET)
  - Summer (DST): UTC+2 (CEST)
- Postal code: 582 91
- Website: www.druhanov.cz

Druhanov is a municipality and village in Havlíčkův Brod District in the Vysočina Region of the Czech Republic. It has about 200 inhabitants.

Druhanov lies approximately 16 kilometres (10 mi) north-west of Havlíčkův Brod, 36 km (22 mi) north of Jihlava, and 84 km (52 mi) south-east of Prague.

== Demographics ==
Historical population
Year	Pop.	±%
1869	190	—
1880	186	−2.1%
1890	307	+65.1%
1900	274	−10.7%
1910	314	+14.6%
1921	314	+0.0%
1930	278	−11.5%
1950	293	+5.4%
1961	140	−52.2%
1970	129	−7.9%
1980	126	−2.3%
1991	103	−18.3%
2001	123	+19.4%
2011	160	+30.1%
2021	171	+6.9%
Source: Censuses
