= Okrouhlička =

- Municipality
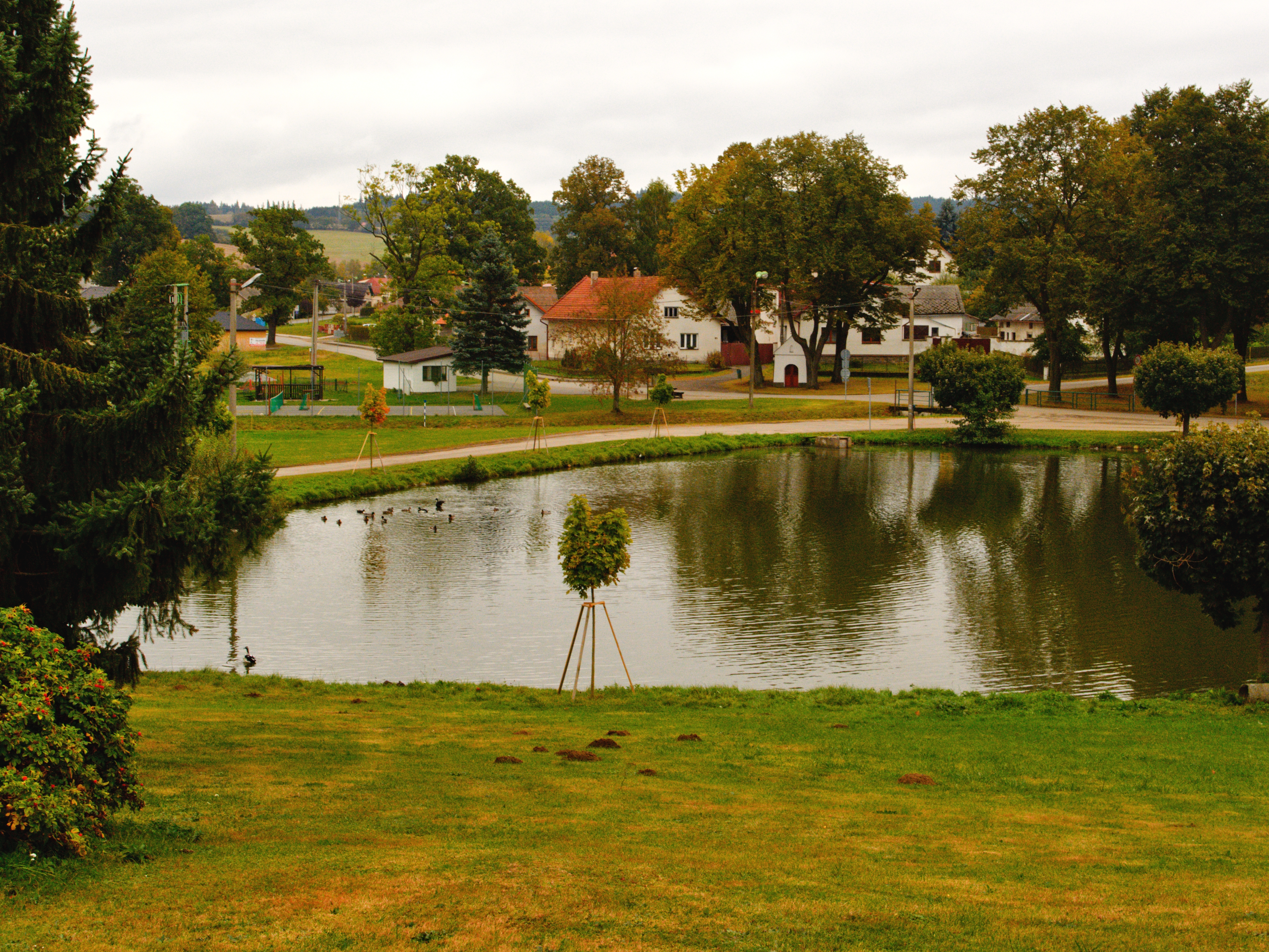
- Centre of Okrouhlička

- Location in the Czech Republic
- Coordinates: 49°32′4″N 15°33′25″E
- Country: Czech Republic
- Region: Vysočina
- District: Havlíčkův Brod
- First mentioned: 1307

Area
  - Total: 6.85 km^{2} (2.64 sq mi)
- Elevation: 478 m (1,568 ft)

Population (2026-01-01)
  - Total: 282
  - Density: 41.2/km^{2} (107/sq mi)
- Time zone: UTC+1 (CET)
  - Summer (DST): UTC+2 (CEST)
- Postal code: 582 53
- Website: www.okrouhlicka.cz

Okrouhlička (until 1945 Šejdorf; German: Scheibelsdorf) is a municipality and village in Havlíčkův Brod District in the Vysočina Region of the Czech Republic. It has about 300 inhabitants.

== Administrative division ==
Okrouhlička consists of two municipal parts (in brackets population according to the 2021 census):

- Okrouhlička (248)
- Skřivánek (26)

== History ==
The first written mention of Okrouhlička is from 1307.

== Demographics ==
Historical population
Year	Pop.	±%
1869	446	—
1880	507	+13.7%
1890	525	+3.6%
1900	479	−8.8%
1910	491	+2.5%
1921	468	−4.7%
1930	400	−14.5%
1950	296	−26.0%
1961	289	−2.4%
1970	253	−12.5%
1980	260	+2.8%
1991	214	−17.7%
2001	194	−9.3%
2011	225	+16.0%
2021	274	+21.8%
Source: Censuses
