= Vepříkov =

- Municipality
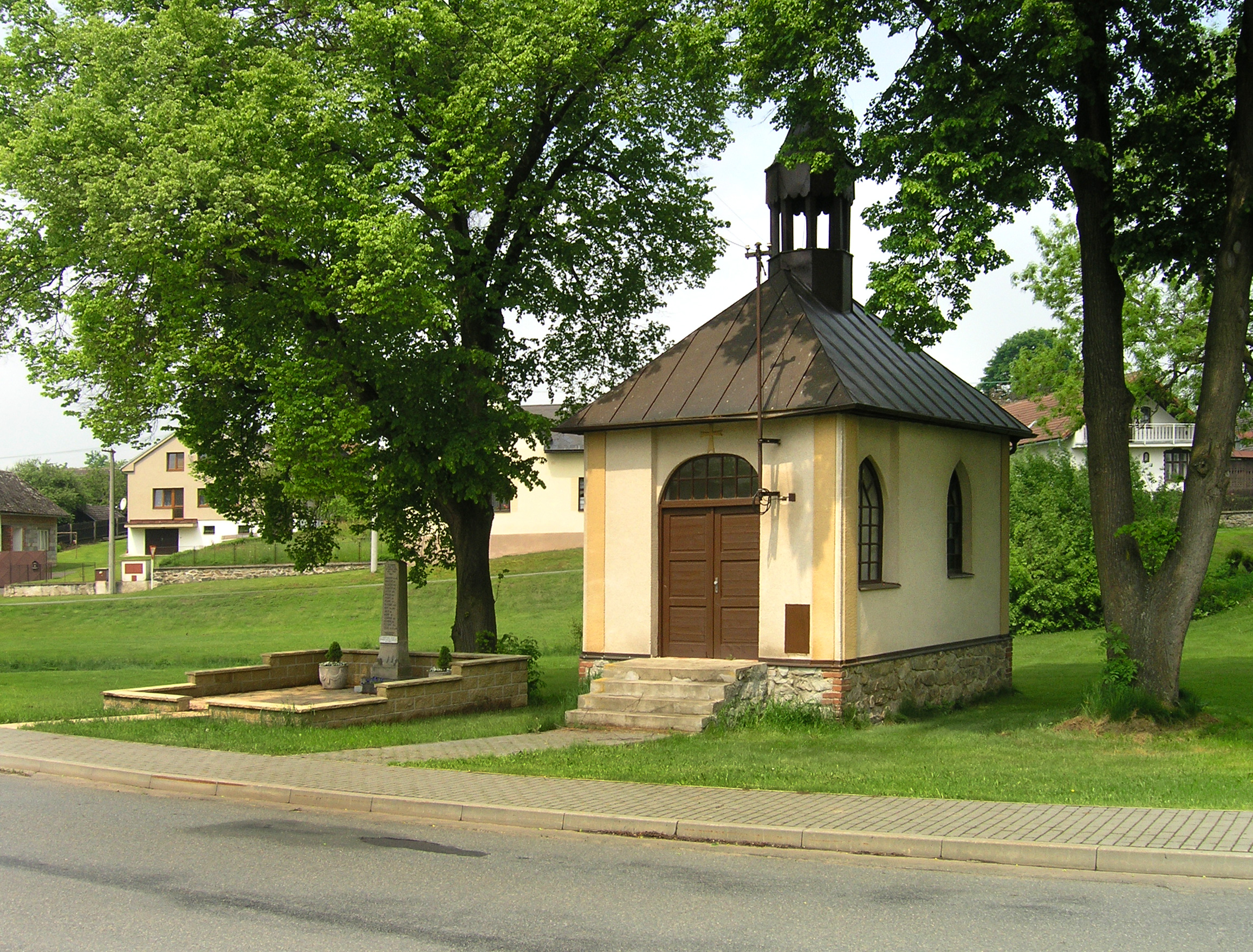
- Chapel of the Holy Spirit

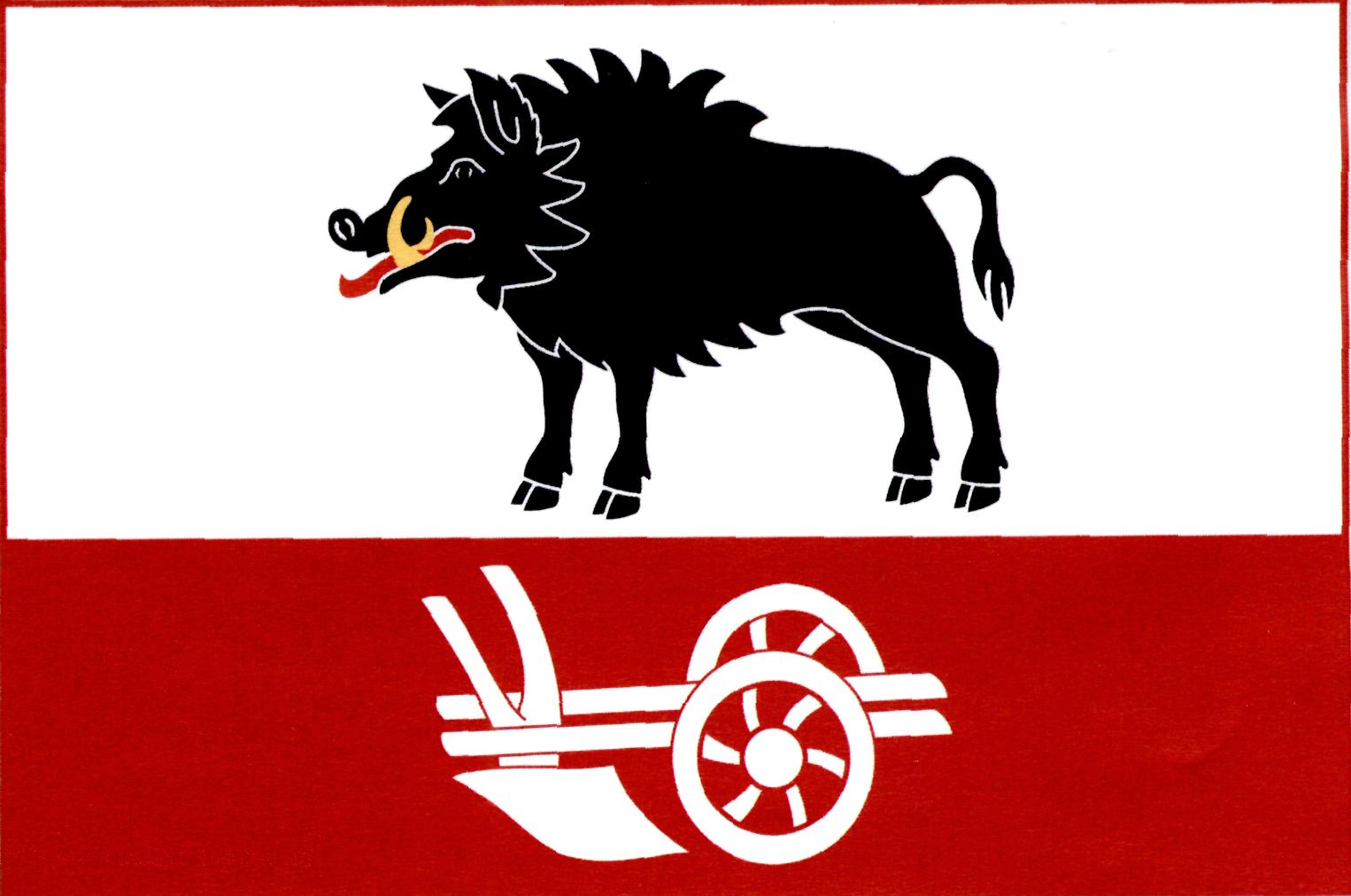
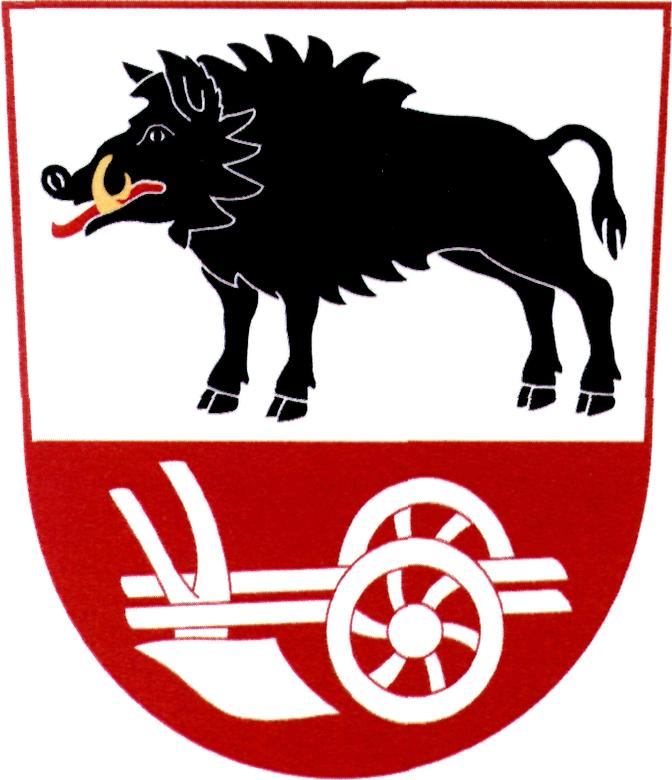
- Flag Coat of arms

- Location in the Czech Republic
- Coordinates: 49°44′39″N 15°34′15″E
- Country: Czech Republic
- Region: Vysočina
- District: Havlíčkův Brod
- First mentioned: 1542

Area
  - Total: 11.41 km^{2} (4.41 sq mi)
- Elevation: 500 m (1,600 ft)

Population (2026-01-01)
  - Total: 346
  - Density: 30.3/km^{2} (78.5/sq mi)
- Time zone: UTC+1 (CET)
  - Summer (DST): UTC+2 (CEST)
- Postal codes: 582 82, 583 01
- Website: www.veprikov.cz

Vepříkov is a municipality and village in Havlíčkův Brod District in the Vysočina Region of the Czech Republic. It has about 300 inhabitants.

Vepříkov lies approximately 16 kilometres (10 mi) north of Havlíčkův Brod, 39 km (24 mi) north of Jihlava, and 91 km (57 mi) south-east of Prague.

== Administrative division ==
Vepříkov consists of two municipal parts (in brackets population according to the 2021 census):

- Vepříkov (242)
- Miřátky (74)

== Demographics ==
Historical population
Year	Pop.	±%
1869	641	—
1880	675	+5.3%
1890	581	−13.9%
1900	562	−3.3%
1910	602	+7.1%
1921	633	+5.1%
1930	579	−8.5%
1950	515	−11.1%
1961	491	−4.7%
1970	444	−9.6%
1980	416	−6.3%
1991	391	−6.0%
2001	375	−4.1%
2011	326	−13.1%
2021	316	−3.1%
Source: Censuses
