= Podmoklany =

- Municipality
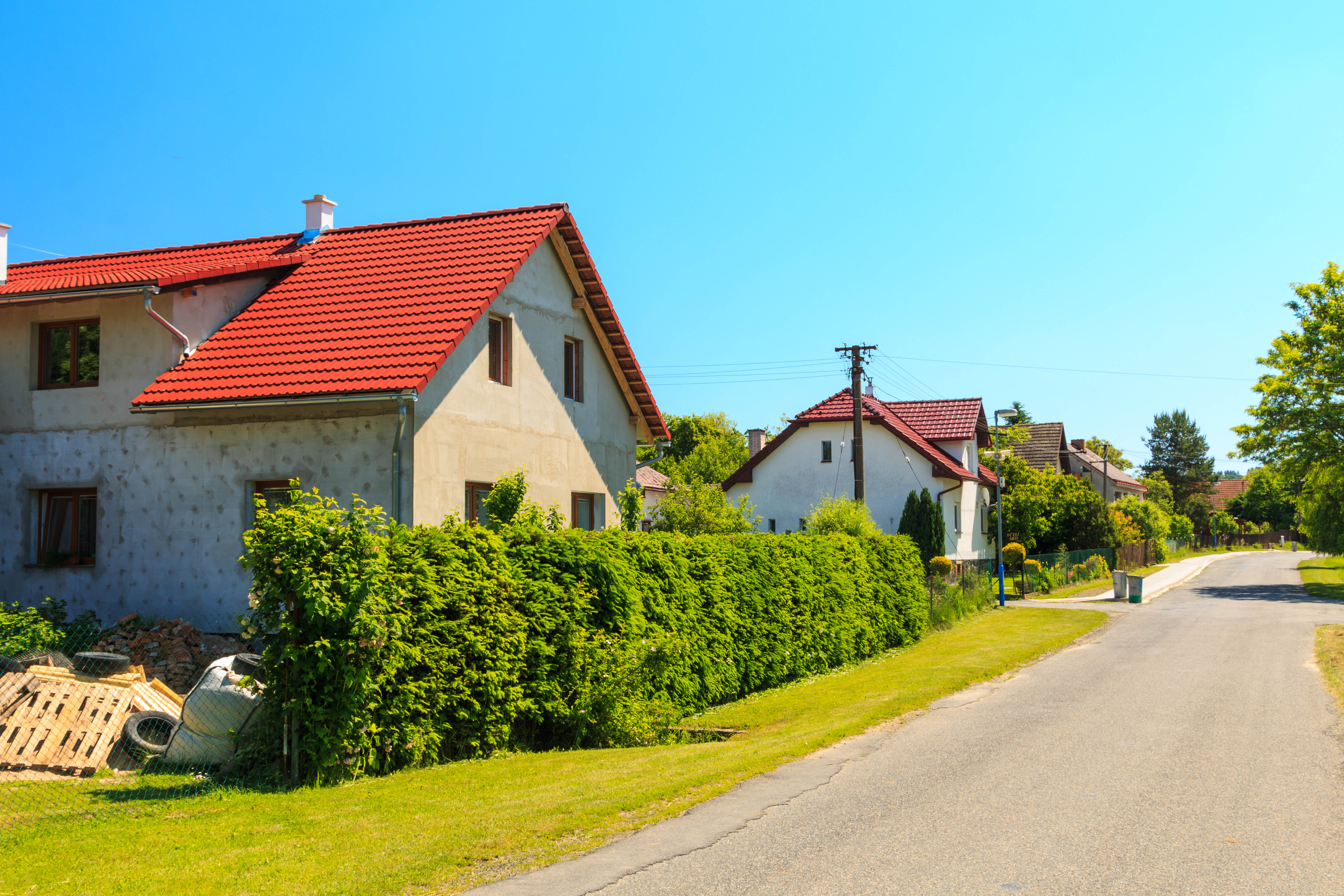
- Main street

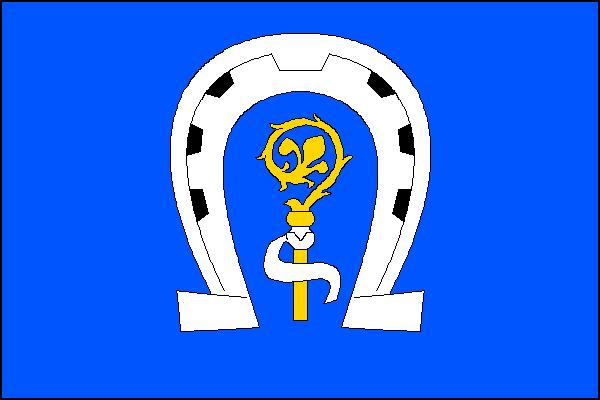
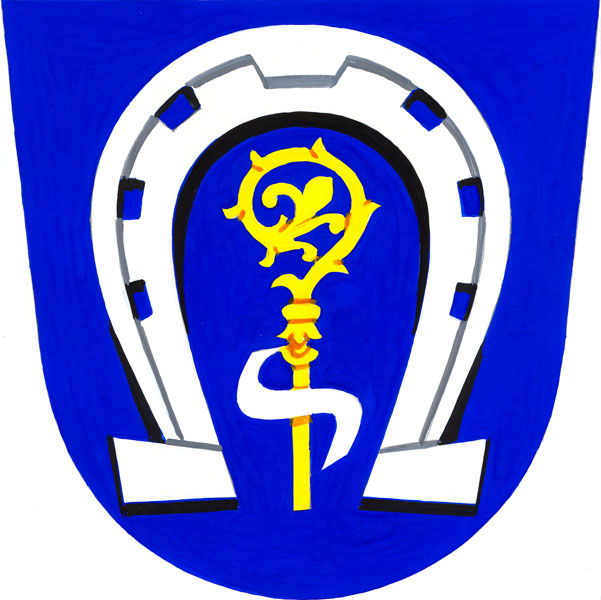
- Flag Coat of arms

- Location in the Czech Republic
- Coordinates: 49°43′18″N 15°46′4″E
- Country: Czech Republic
- Region: Vysočina
- District: Havlíčkův Brod
- First mentioned: 1242

Area
  - Total: 4.22 km^{2} (1.63 sq mi)
- Elevation: 473 m (1,552 ft)

Population (2026-01-01)
  - Total: 129
  - Density: 30.6/km^{2} (79.2/sq mi)
- Time zone: UTC+1 (CET)
  - Summer (DST): UTC+2 (CEST)
- Postal code: 582 64
- Website: www.podmoklany.cz

Podmoklany is a municipality and village in Havlíčkův Brod District in the Vysočina Region of the Czech Republic. It has about 100 inhabitants.

Podmoklany lies approximately 19 kilometres (12 mi) north-east of Havlíčkův Brod, 39 km (24 mi) north of Jihlava, and 105 km (65 mi) south-east of Prague.

== Administrative division ==
Podmoklany consists of three municipal parts (in brackets population according to the 2021 census):

- Podmoklany (119)
- Branišov (1)
- Hudeč (10)

== Demographics ==
Historical population
Year	Pop.	±%
1869	393	—
1880	411	+4.6%
1890	407	−1.0%
1900	475	+16.7%
1910	447	−5.9%
1921	400	−10.5%
1930	355	−11.3%
1950	221	−37.7%
1961	217	−1.8%
1970	192	−11.5%
1980	181	−5.7%
1991	173	−4.4%
2001	163	−5.8%
2011	126	−22.7%
2021	130	+3.2%
Source: Censuses
