= Chrtníč =

- Municipality
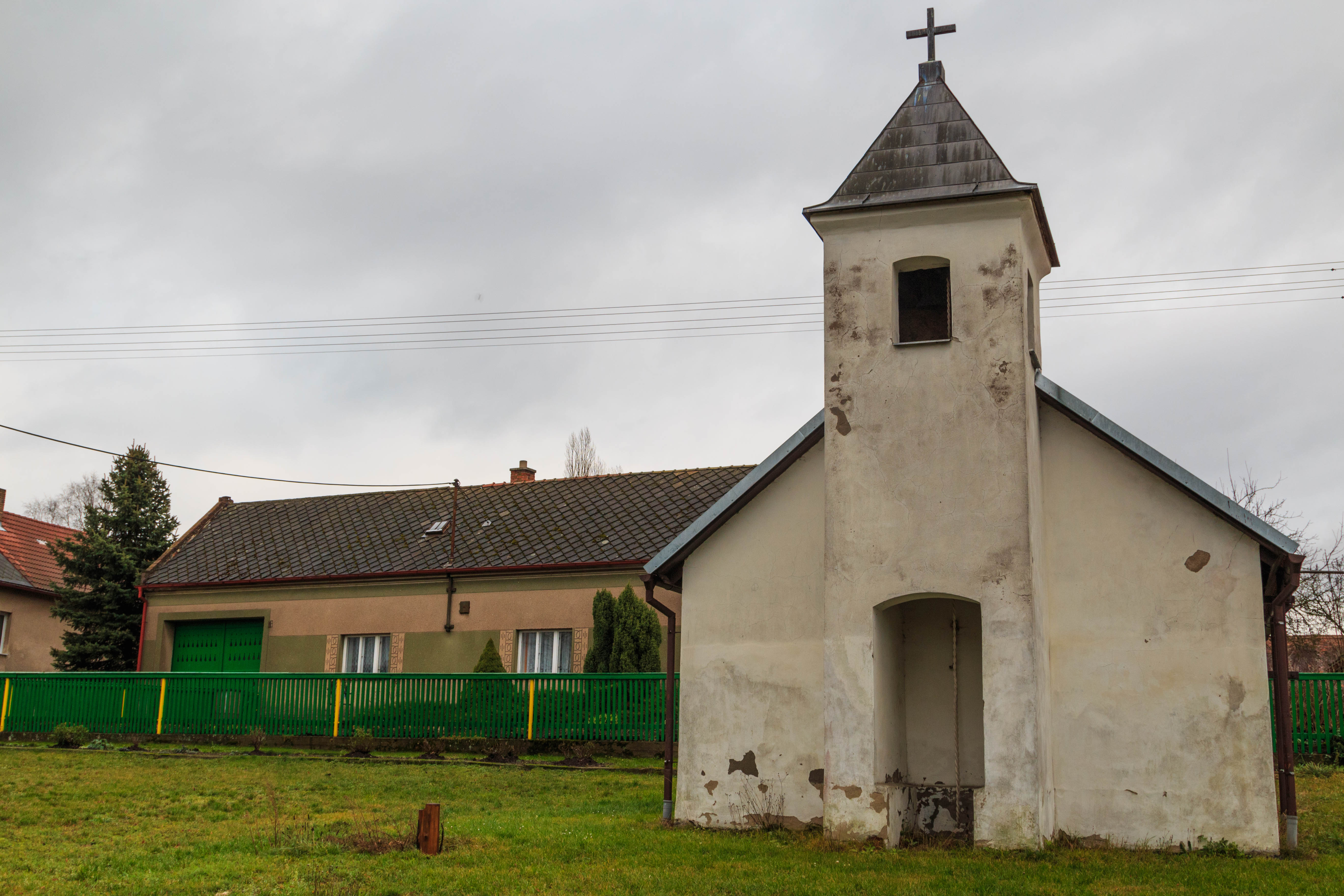
- Belfry

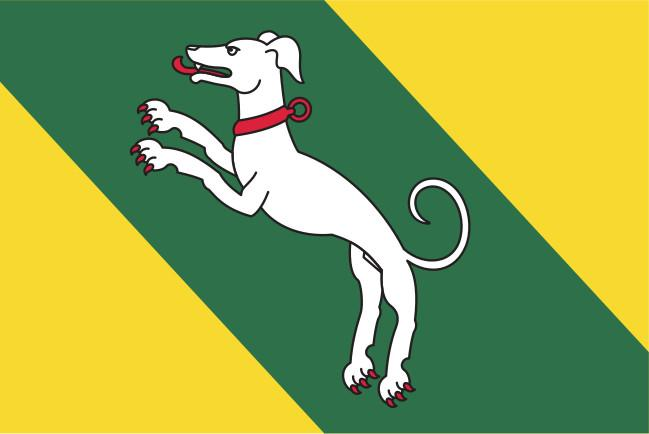
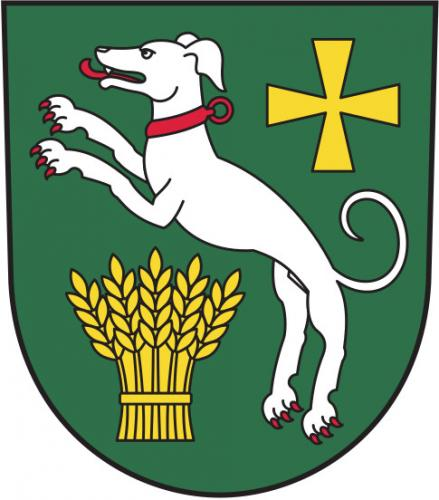
- Flag Coat of arms

- Location in the Czech Republic
- Coordinates: 49°46′3″N 15°26′37″E
- Country: Czech Republic
- Region: Vysočina
- District: Havlíčkův Brod
- First mentioned: 1391

Area
  - Total: 6.61 km^{2} (2.55 sq mi)
- Elevation: 464 m (1,522 ft)

Population (2026-01-01)
  - Total: 117
  - Density: 17.7/km^{2} (45.8/sq mi)
- Time zone: UTC+1 (CET)
  - Summer (DST): UTC+2 (CEST)
- Postal code: 582 82
- Website: www.chrtnic.cz

Chrtníč is a municipality and village in Havlíčkův Brod District in the Vysočina Region of the Czech Republic. It has about 100 inhabitants.

Chrtníč lies approximately 21 kilometres (13 mi) north-west of Havlíčkův Brod, 43 km (27 mi) north of Jihlava, and 82 km (51 mi) south-east of Prague.

== Demographics ==
Historical population
Year	Pop.	±%
1869	328	—
1880	371	+13.1%
1890	328	−11.6%
1900	342	+4.3%
1910	414	+21.1%
1921	419	+1.2%
1930	357	−14.8%
1950	284	−20.4%
1961	264	−7.0%
1970	220	−16.7%
1980	190	−13.6%
1991	165	−13.2%
2001	157	−4.8%
2011	127	−19.1%
2021	114	−10.2%
Source: Censuses
