= Čachotín =

- Municipality
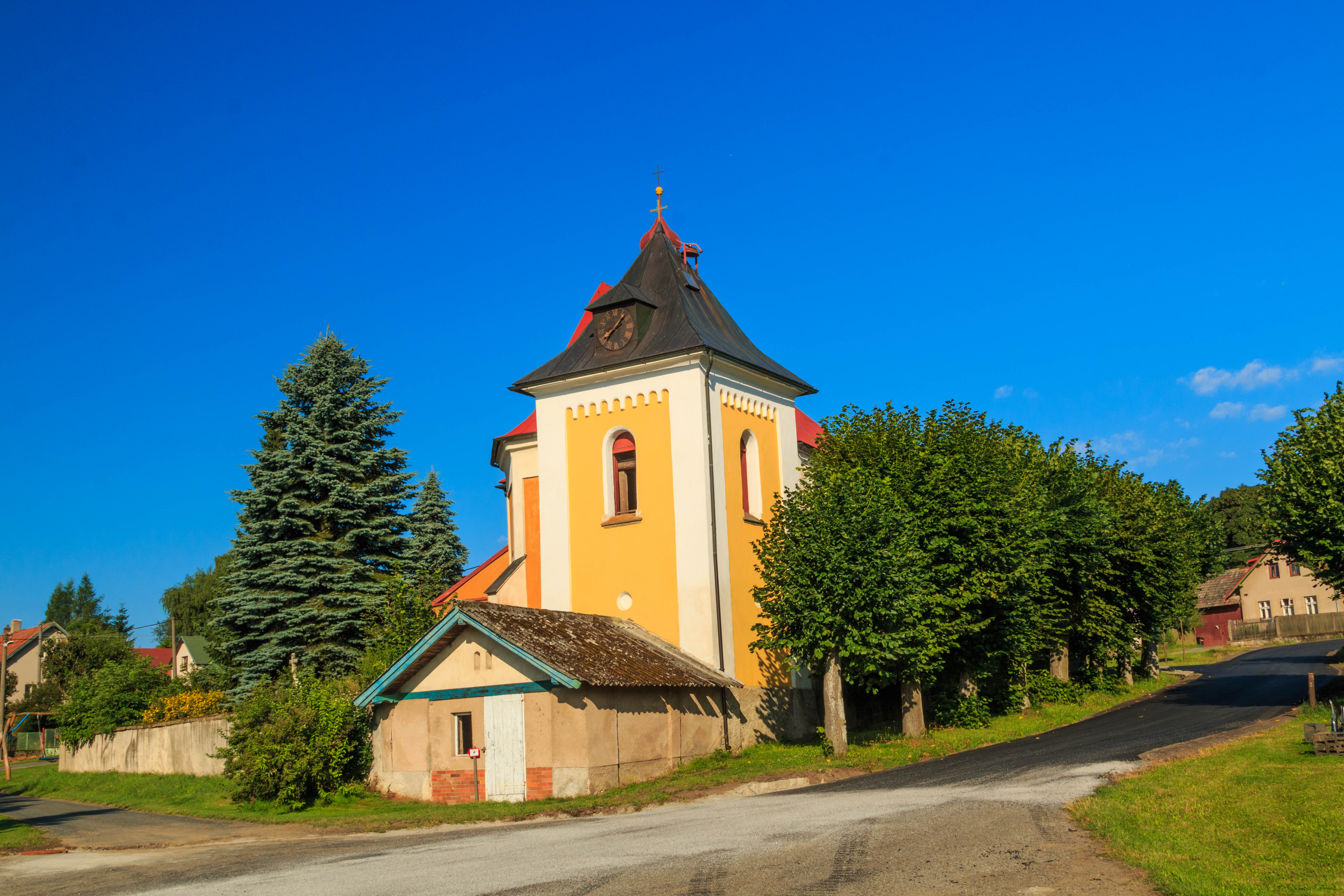
- Church of Saint Lawrence

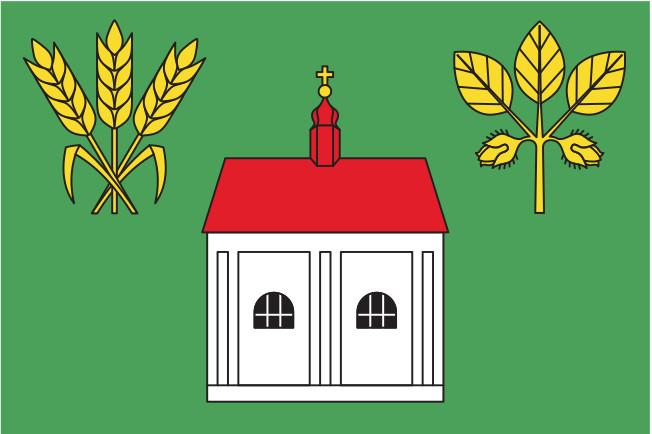
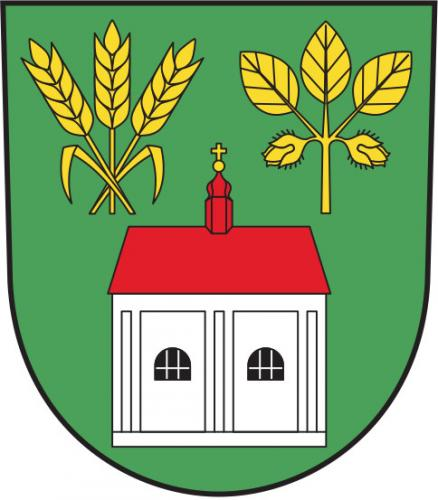
- Flag Coat of arms

- Location in the Czech Republic
- Coordinates: 49°41′43″N 15°36′31″E
- Country: Czech Republic
- Region: Vysočina
- District: Havlíčkův Brod
- First mentioned: 1352

Area
  - Total: 6.30 km^{2} (2.43 sq mi)
- Elevation: 572 m (1,877 ft)

Population (2026-01-01)
  - Total: 166
  - Density: 26.3/km^{2} (68.2/sq mi)
- Time zone: UTC+1 (CET)
  - Summer (DST): UTC+2 (CEST)
- Postal code: 583 01
- Website: www.cachotin.cz

Čachotín (Czech pronunciation: [ˈtʃaxociːn]) is a municipality and village in Havlíčkův Brod District in the Vysočina Region of the Czech Republic. It has about 200 inhabitants.

Čachotín lies approximately 10 kilometres (6 mi) north of Havlíčkův Brod, 33 km (21 mi) north of Jihlava, and 96 km (60 mi) south-east of Prague.

== Demographics ==
Historical population
Year	Pop.	±%
1869	405	—
1880	485	+19.8%
1890	416	−14.2%
1900	387	−7.0%
1910	424	+9.6%
1921	398	−6.1%
1930	352	−11.6%
1950	262	−25.6%
1961	241	−8.0%
1970	198	−17.8%
1980	177	−10.6%
1991	175	−1.1%
2001	179	+2.3%
2011	179	+0.0%
2021	161	−10.1%
Source: Censuses
