= Kunemil =

- Municipality
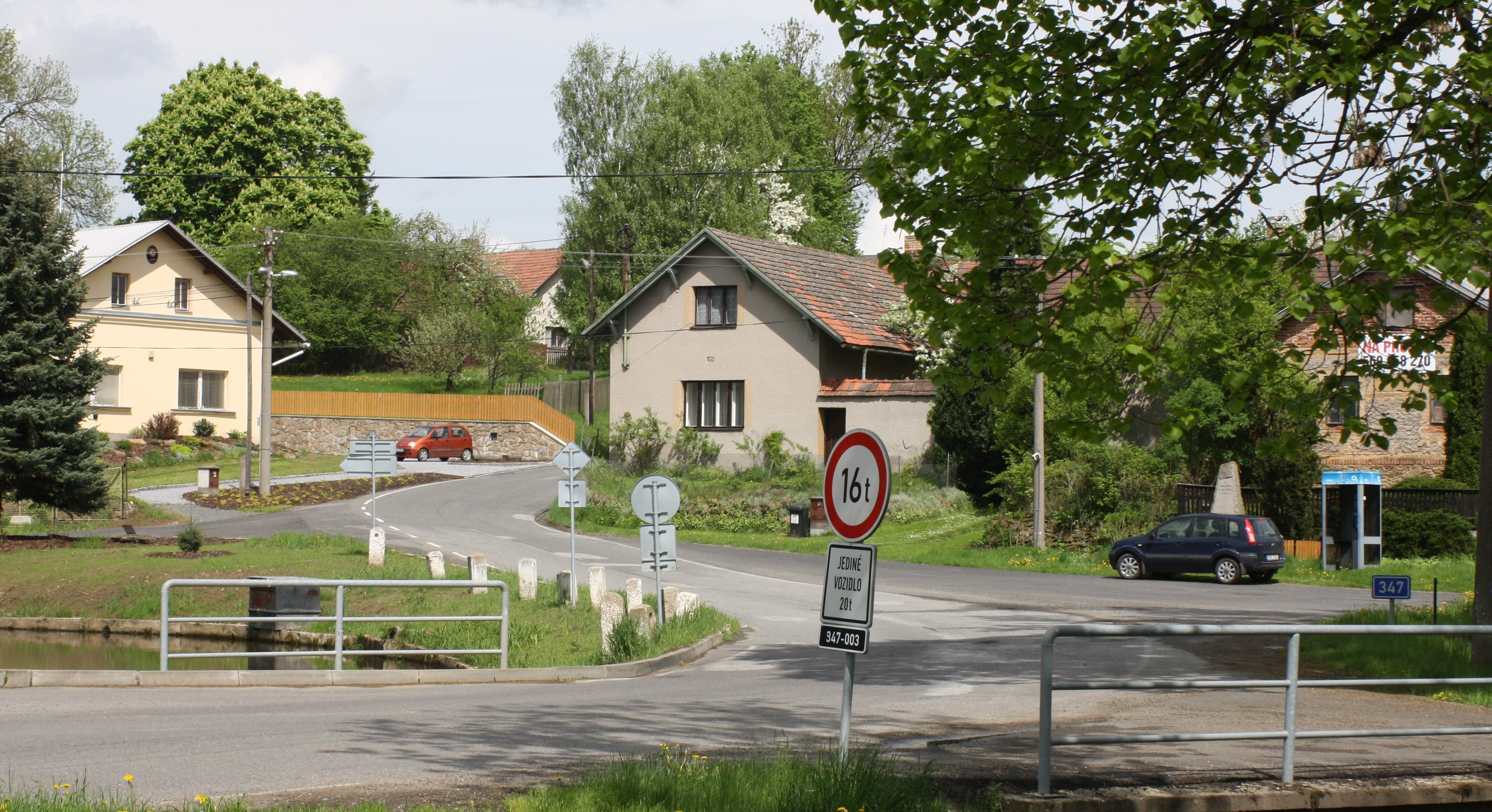
- Centre of Kunemil

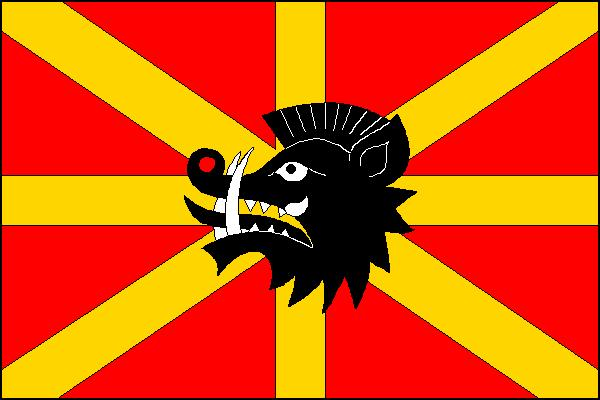
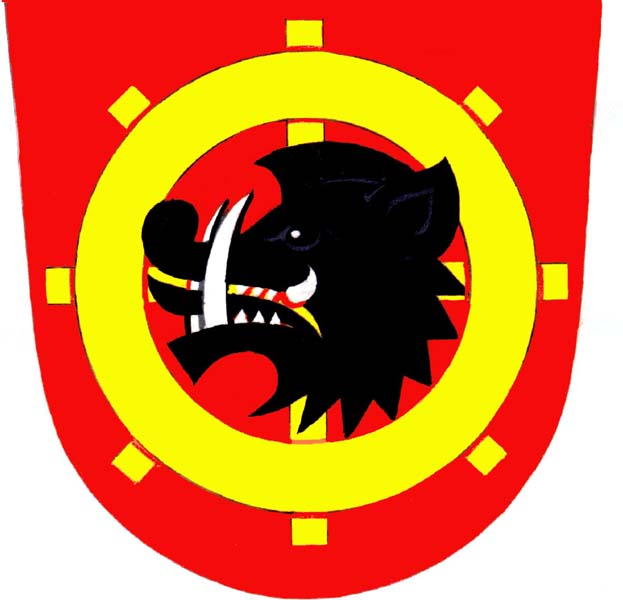
- Flag Coat of arms

- Location in the Czech Republic
- Coordinates: 49°42′27″N 15°25′54″E
- Country: Czech Republic
- Region: Vysočina
- District: Havlíčkův Brod
- First mentioned: 1310

Area
  - Total: 4.50 km^{2} (1.74 sq mi)
- Elevation: 468 m (1,535 ft)

Population (2026-01-01)
  - Total: 127
  - Density: 28.2/km^{2} (73.1/sq mi)
- Time zone: UTC+1 (CET)
  - Summer (DST): UTC+2 (CEST)
- Postal code: 582 91
- Website: www.kunemil.cz

Kunemil is a municipality and village in Havlíčkův Brod District in the Vysočina Region of the Czech Republic. It has about 100 inhabitants.

Kunemil lies approximately 16 kilometres (10 mi) north-west of Havlíčkův Brod, 37 km (23 mi) north of Jihlava, and 84 km (52 mi) south-east of Prague.

== Demographics ==
Historical population
Year	Pop.	±%
1869	368	—
1880	440	+19.6%
1890	397	−9.8%
1900	423	+6.5%
1910	396	−6.4%
1921	364	−8.1%
1930	320	−12.1%
1950	235	−26.6%
1961	208	−11.5%
1970	182	−12.5%
1980	157	−13.7%
1991	112	−28.7%
2001	109	−2.7%
2011	109	+0.0%
2021	109	+0.0%
Source: Censuses
