= Příseka =

- Municipality
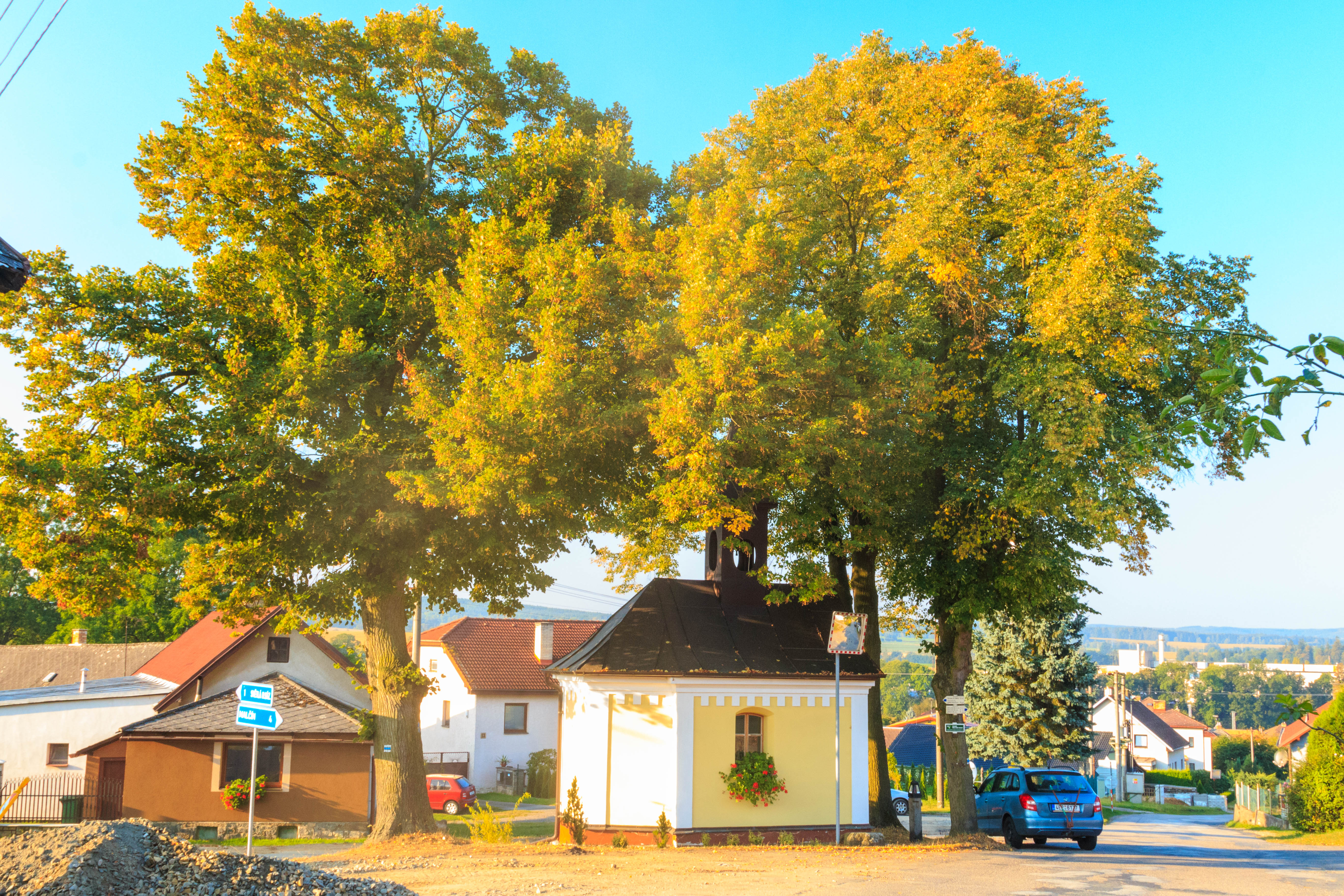
- Centre of Příseka

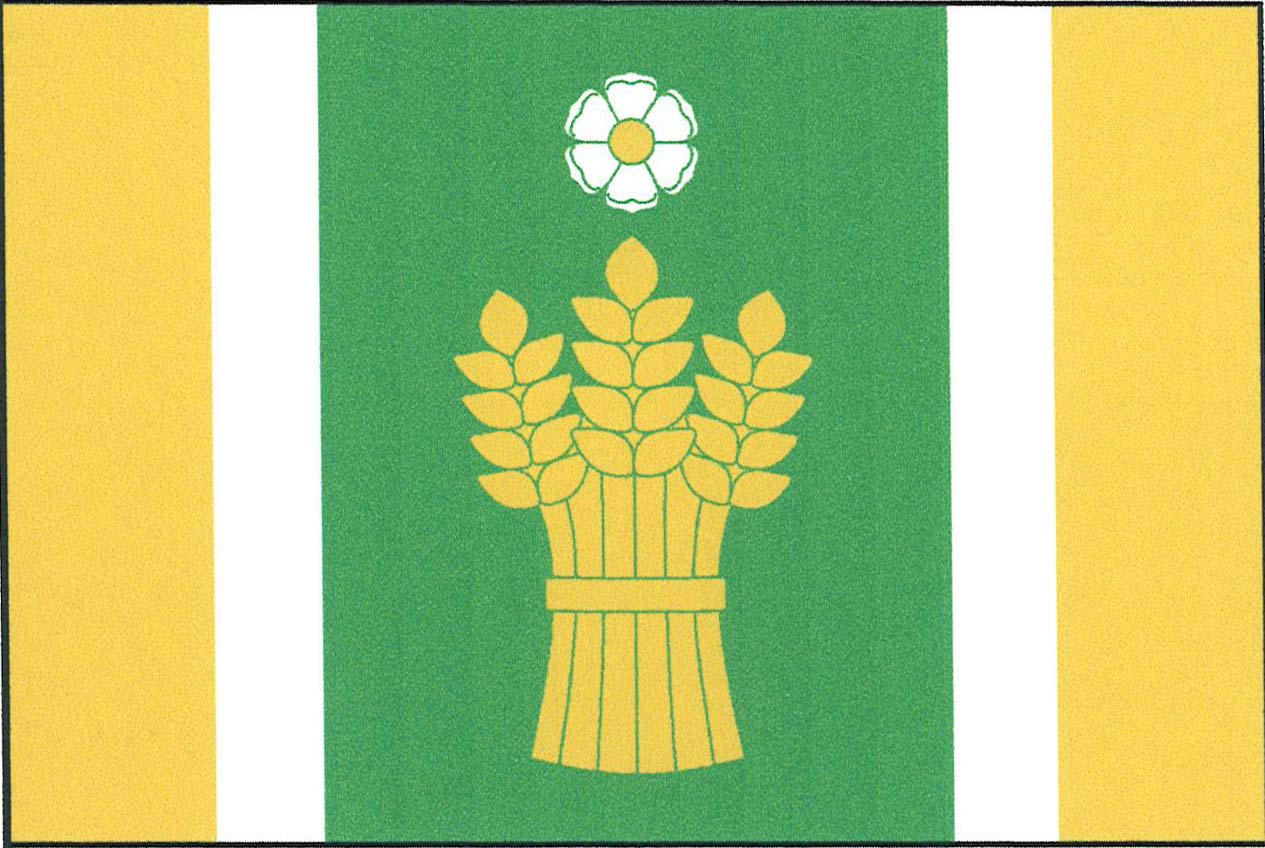
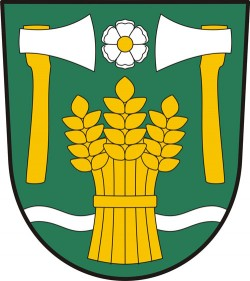
- Flag Coat of arms

- Location in the Czech Republic
- Coordinates: 49°40′15″N 15°25′32″E
- Country: Czech Republic
- Region: Vysočina
- District: Havlíčkův Brod
- First mentioned: 1591

Area
  - Total: 3.21 km^{2} (1.24 sq mi)
- Elevation: 420 m (1,380 ft)

Population (2026-01-01)
  - Total: 435
  - Density: 136/km^{2} (351/sq mi)
- Time zone: UTC+1 (CET)
  - Summer (DST): UTC+2 (CEST)
- Postal code: 582 91
- Website: www.priseka.cz

Příseka is a municipality and village in Havlíčkův Brod District in the Vysočina Region of the Czech Republic. It has about 400 inhabitants.

Příseka lies approximately 13 kilometres (8 mi) north-west of Havlíčkův Brod, 33 km (21 mi) north of Jihlava, and 87 km (54 mi) south-east of Prague.

== Demographics ==
Historical population
Year	Pop.	±%
1869	228	—
1880	270	+18.4%
1890	240	−11.1%
1900	260	+8.3%
1910	309	+18.8%
1921	349	+12.9%
1930	383	+9.7%
1950	411	+7.3%
1961	305	−25.8%
1970	329	+7.9%
1980	321	−2.4%
1991	334	+4.0%
2001	319	−4.5%
2011	413	+29.5%
2021	417	+1.0%
Source: Censuses
