= Květinov =

- Municipality
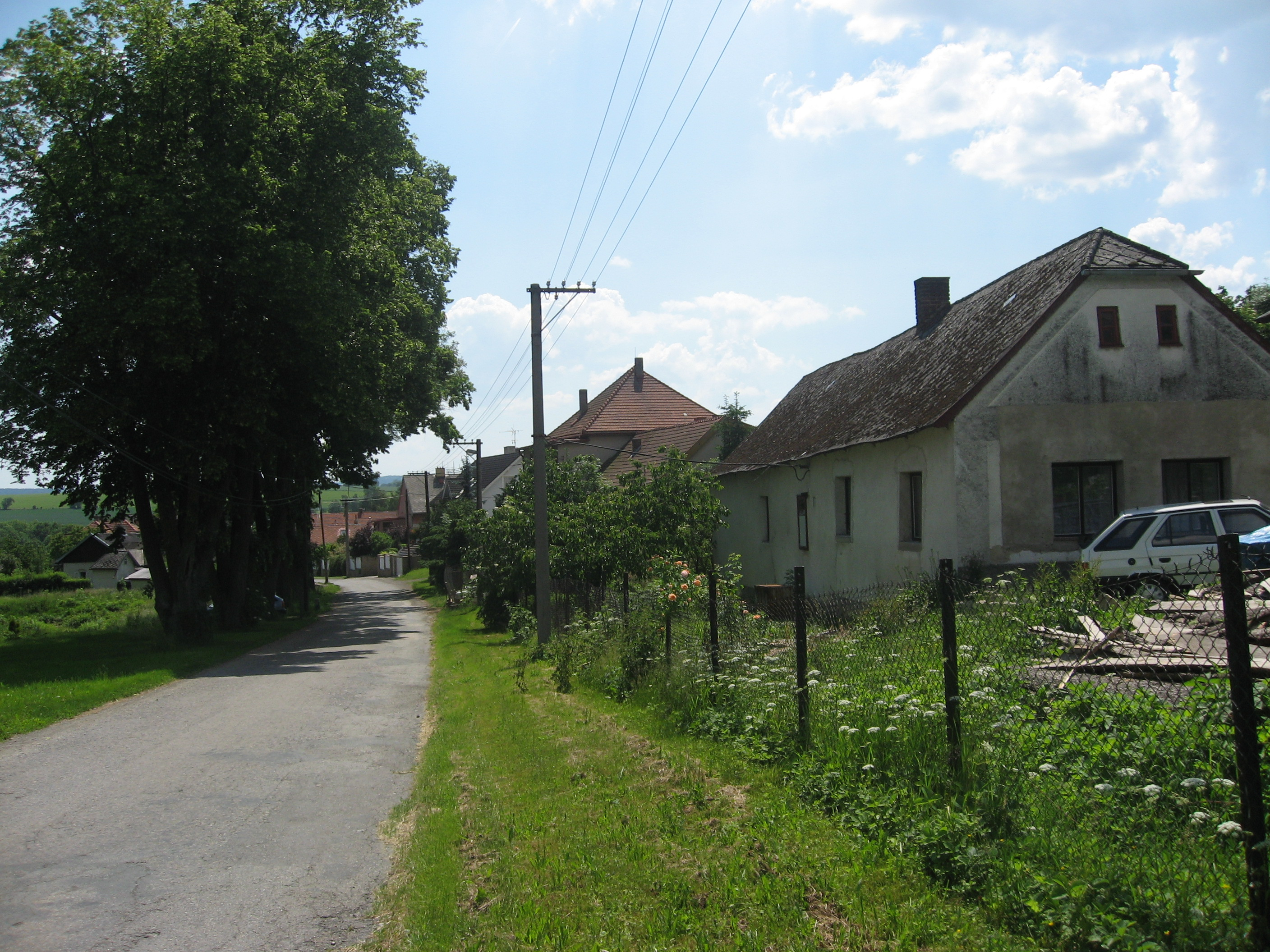
- Side street

- Location in the Czech Republic
- Coordinates: 49°33′53″N 15°30′26″E
- Country: Czech Republic
- Region: Vysočina
- District: Havlíčkův Brod
- First mentioned: 1436

Area
  - Total: 7.08 km^{2} (2.73 sq mi)
- Elevation: 479 m (1,572 ft)

Population (2026-01-01)
  - Total: 231
  - Density: 32.6/km^{2} (84.5/sq mi)
- Time zone: UTC+1 (CET)
  - Summer (DST): UTC+2 (CEST)
- Postal codes: 580 01, 582 55
- Website: www.kvetinov.cz

Květinov is a municipality and village in Havlíčkův Brod District in the Vysočina Region of the Czech Republic. It has about 200 inhabitants.

== Administrative division ==
Květinov consists of three municipal parts (in brackets population according to the 2021 census):

- Květinov (141)
- Kvasetice (16)
- Radňov (64)

== Demographics ==
Historical population
| Year | Pop. | ±% |
|---|---|---|
| 1869 | 579 | — |
| 1880 | 559 | −3.5% |
| 1890 | 595 | +6.4% |
| 1900 | 589 | −1.0% |
| 1910 | 521 | −11.5% |
| 1921 | 561 | +7.7% |
| 1930 | 504 | −10.2% |
| 1950 | 429 | −14.9% |
| 1961 | 460 | +7.2% |
| 1970 | 379 | −17.6% |
| 1980 | 267 | −29.6% |
| 1991 | 232 | −13.1% |
| 2001 | 203 | −12.5% |
| 2011 | 237 | +16.7% |
| 2021 | 221 | −6.8% |
Source: Censuses
