= Havlíčkův Brod District =

Havlíčkův Brod District Okres Havlíčkův Brod
- District
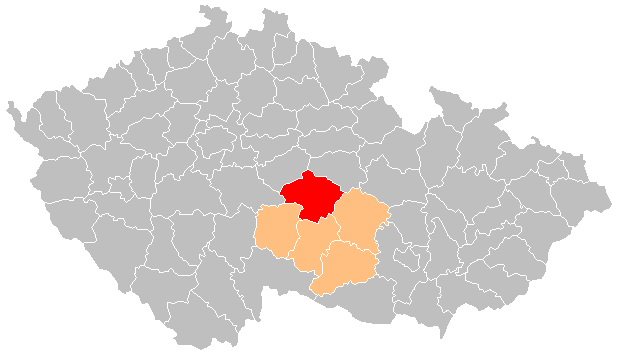
- Location in the Vysočina Region within the Czech Republic
- Coordinates: 49°42′N 15°35′E
- Country: Czech Republic
- Region: Vysočina
- Capital: Havlíčkův Brod

Area
  - Total: 1,264.97 km^{2} (488.41 sq mi)

Population (2026)
  - Total: 95,359
  - Density: 75.384/km^{2} (195.24/sq mi)
- Time zone: UTC+1 (CET)
  - Summer (DST): UTC+2 (CEST)
- Municipalities: 120
- * Towns: 9
- * Market towns: 8

Havlíčkův Brod District (Czech: okres Havlíčkův Brod) is a district in the Vysočina Region of the Czech Republic. Its capital is the town of Havlíčkův Brod.

== Administrative division ==
Havlíčkův Brod District is divided into three administrative districts of municipalities with extended competence: Havlíčkův Brod, Chotěboř and Světlá nad Sázavou.

=== List of municipalities ===
Towns are marked in bold and market towns in italics:

Bačkov - Bartoušov - Bělá - Bezděkov - Bojiště - Boňkov - Borek - Břevnice - Čachotín - Čečkovice - Česká Bělá - Chotěboř - Chrtníč - Chřenovice - Číhošť - Dlouhá Ves - Dolní Krupá - Dolní Město - Dolní Sokolovec - Druhanov - Golčův Jeníkov - Habry - Havlíčkova Borová - Havlíčkův Brod - Herálec - Heřmanice - Hněvkovice - Horní Krupá - Horní Paseka - Hradec - Hurtova Lhota - Jedlá - Jeřišno - Jilem - Jitkov - Kámen - Kamenná Lhota - Klokočov - Knyk - Kochánov - Kojetín - Kouty - Kožlí - Kozlov - Kraborovice - Krásná Hora - Krátká Ves - Krucemburk - Kunemil - Květinov - Kyjov - Kynice - Lány - Ledeč nad Sázavou - Leškovice - Leština u Světlé - Libice nad Doubravou - Lípa - Lipnice nad Sázavou - Lučice - Malčín - Maleč - Michalovice - Modlíkov - Nejepín - Nová Ves u Chotěboře - Nová Ves u Leštiny - Nová Ves u Světlé - Okrouhlice - Okrouhlička - Olešenka - Olešná - Ostrov - Oudoleň - Ovesná Lhota - Pavlov - Podmoklany - Podmoky - Pohled - Pohleď - Přibyslav - Příseka - Prosíčka - Radostín - Rozsochatec - Rušinov - Rybníček - Sázavka - Sedletín - Skorkov - Šlapanov - Skryje - Skuhrov - Slavětín - Slavíkov - Slavníč - Sloupno - Služátky - Sobíňov - Štoky - Stříbrné Hory - Světlá nad Sázavou - Tis - Trpišovice - Uhelná Příbram - Úhořilka - Úsobí - Vepříkov - Veselý Žďár - Věž - Věžnice - Vilémov - Vilémovice - Víska - Vlkanov - Vysoká - Ždírec - Ždírec nad Doubravou - Žižkovo Pole - Zvěstovice

== Geography ==
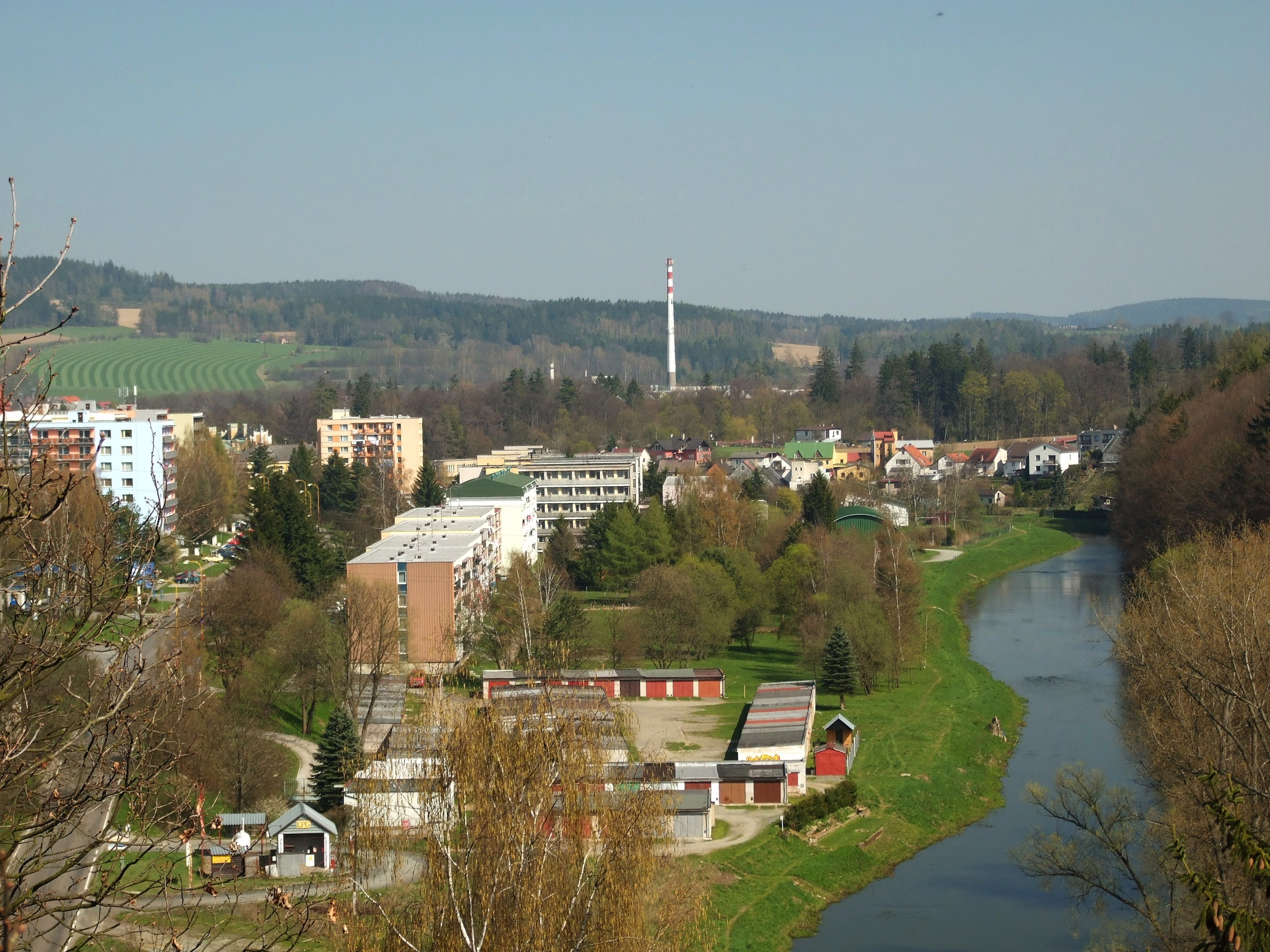
View of Světlá nad Sázavou

A hilly landscape is typical for the district. The territory extends into four geomorphological mesoregions: Upper Sázava Hills (most of the territory), Křemešník Highlands (southwest), Iron Mountains (northeast) and Křižanov Highlands (small part in the east). The highest point of the district is the hill Melechov in Dolní Město with an elevation of 715 m (2,346 ft), the lowest point is the river bed of the Doubravka in Zvěstovice at 253 m (830 ft).

From the total district area of 1,265.0 km^{2} (488.4 sq mi), agricultural land occupies 789.0 km^{2} (304.6 sq mi), forests occupy 362.3 km^{2} (139.9 sq mi), and water area occupies 20.2 km^{2} (7.8 sq mi). Forests cover 28.6% of the district's area.

The most important river is the Sázava, which flows across the whole district from east to west. The Doubrava River flows through the northeastern part of the district. The largest body of water is the Řeka fishpond with an area of 43 ha (110 acres), built on the Doubrava River. Notable is also Švihov Reservoir, part of which lies on the western district border.

Two protected landscape areas extend into the district in the east: Iron Mountains and Žďárské vrchy.

== Demographics ==
Historical population

Year	Pop.	±%
1869	106,265	—
1880	109,122	+2.7%
1890	105,569	−3.3%
1900	105,620	+0.0%
1910	110,719	+4.8%

Year	Pop.	±%
1921	109,171	−1.4%
1930	105,871	−3.0%
1950	93,312	−11.9%
1961	96,897	+3.8%
1970	95,716	−1.2%

Year	Pop.	±%
1980	98,005	+2.4%
1991	96,113	−1.9%
2001	95,040	−1.1%
2011	94,217	−0.9%
2021	92,907	−1.4%

Source: Censuses

=== Most populous municipalities ===
Name	Population	Area (km^{2})
Havlíčkův Brod	23,368	65
Chotěboř	9,076	54
Světlá nad Sázavou	6,289	42
Ledeč nad Sázavou	4,756	17
Přibyslav	3,997	35
Ždírec nad Doubravou	3,064	27
Golčův Jeníkov	2,835	27
Štoky	1,980	40
Krucemburk	1,583	29
Okrouhlice	1,374	19

== Economy ==
The largest employers with headquarters in Havlíčkův Brod District and at least 500 employees are:

Economic entity	Location	Number of employees	Main activity
Havlíčkův Brod Hospital	Havlíčkův Brod	1,500–1,999	Health care
GCE	Chotěboř	500–999	Manufacture of welding supplies
Futaba Czech	Havlíčkův Brod	500–999	Automotive industry
Pleas	Havlíčkův Brod	500–999	Manufacture of underwear
Psychiatric Hospital Havlíčkův Brod	Havlíčkův Brod	500–999	Health care
ACO Industries	Přibyslav	500–999	Manufacture of drainage systems
Stora Enso Wood Products Ždírec	Ždírec nad Doubravou	500–999	Manufacture of paper and wooden products

== Transport ==
The D1 motorway from Prague to Brno passes through the southern part of the district.

== Sights ==
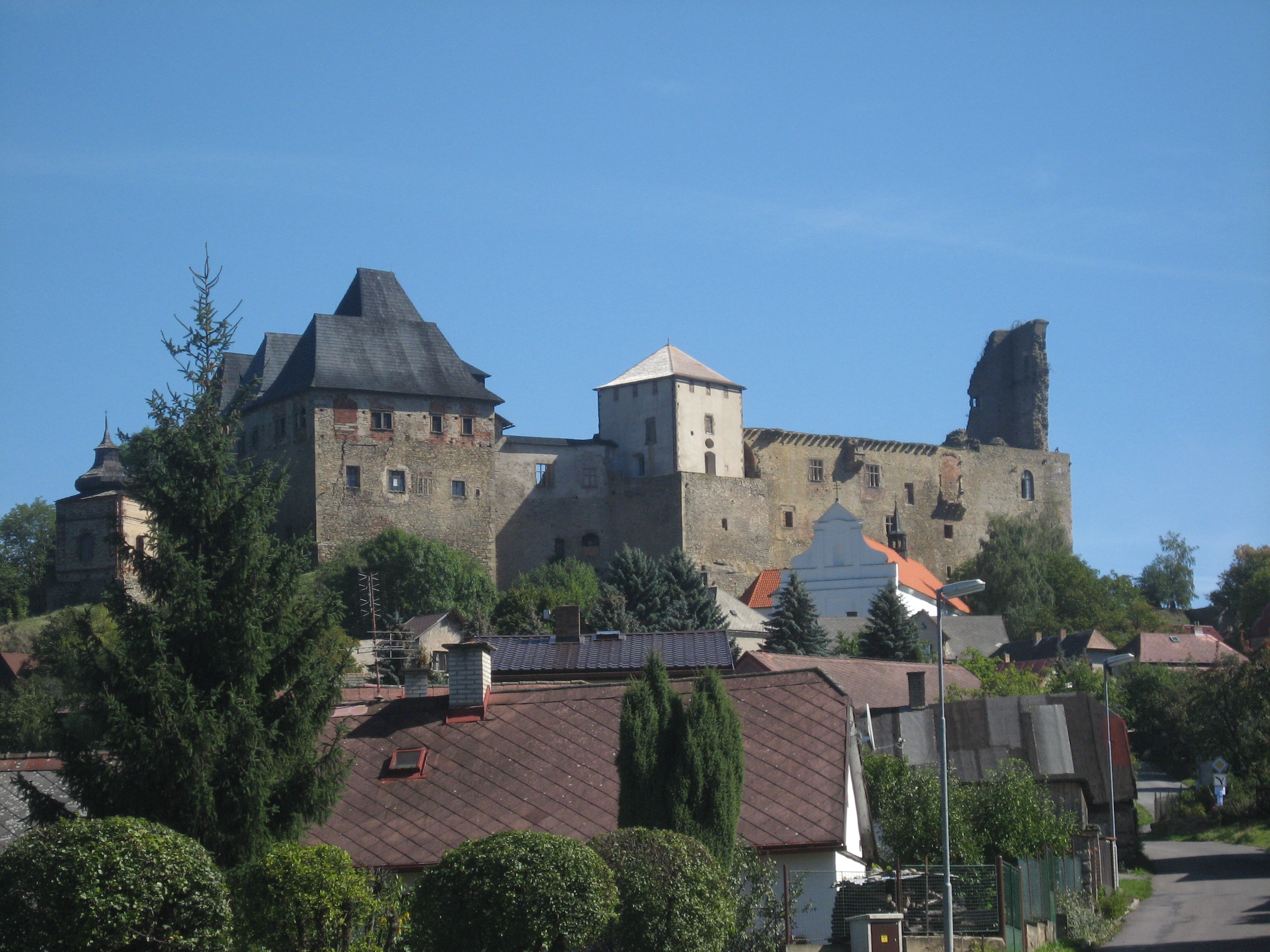
Lipnice nad Sázavou Castle

The most important monuments in the district, protected as national cultural monuments, are:

- Birthplace of Karel Havlíček Borovský in Havlíčkova Borová
- Lipnice nad Sázavou Castle
- Štáfl's cottage in Havlíčkův Brod
- Glassworks in Tasice
- Michal's farm in Pohleď
- Old Town Hall in Havlíčkův Brod

The best-preserved settlements, protected as monument zones, are:

- Chotěboř
- Havlíčkova Borová
- Havlíčkův Brod
- Ledeč nad Sázavou
- Petrovice
- Přibyslav

The most visited tourist destination is the Lipnice nad Sázavou Castle.
