= Boňkov =

- Municipality
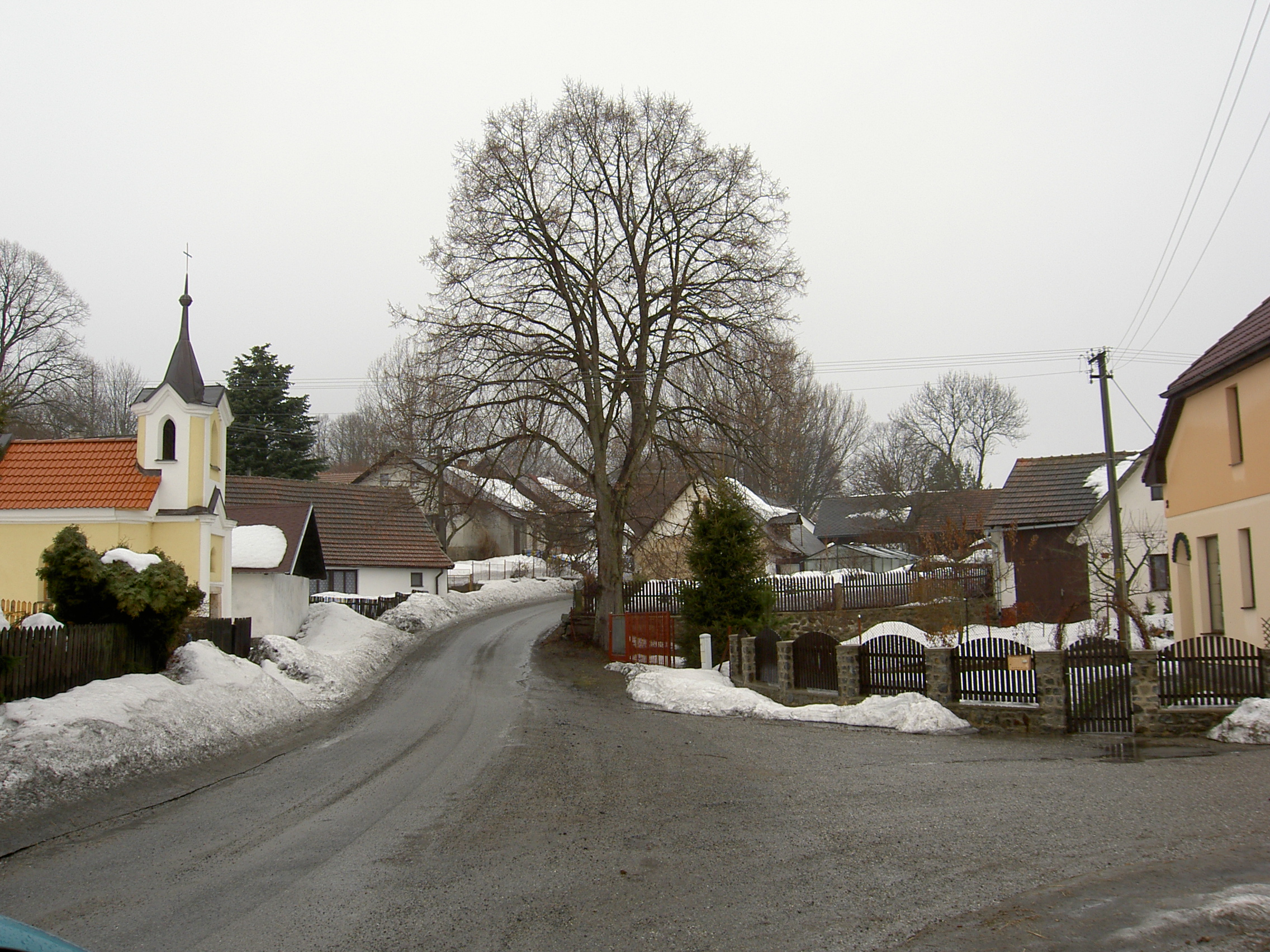
- Centre of Boňkov

- Location in the Czech Republic
- Coordinates: 49°32′50″N 15°26′51″E
- Country: Czech Republic
- Region: Vysočina
- District: Havlíčkův Brod
- First mentioned: 1305

Area
  - Total: 2.08 km^{2} (0.80 sq mi)
- Elevation: 540 m (1,770 ft)

Population (2026-01-01)
  - Total: 77
  - Density: 37/km^{2} (96/sq mi)
- Time zone: UTC+1 (CET)
  - Summer (DST): UTC+2 (CEST)
- Postal code: 582 55
- Website: www.obecbonkov.cz

Boňkov (Czech pronunciation: [ˈboɲkof]) is a municipality and village in Havlíčkův Brod District in the Vysočina Region of the Czech Republic. It has about 80 inhabitants.

== Demographics ==
Historical population
Year	Pop.	±%
1869	196	—
1880	212	+8.2%
1890	196	−7.5%
1900	191	−2.6%
1910	179	−6.3%
1921	198	+10.6%
1930	170	−14.1%
1950	152	−10.6%
1961	130	−14.5%
1970	117	−10.0%
1980	104	−11.1%
1991	68	−34.6%
2001	58	−14.7%
2011	66	+13.8%
2021	66	+0.0%
Source: Censuses
