= Zvěstovice =

- Municipality
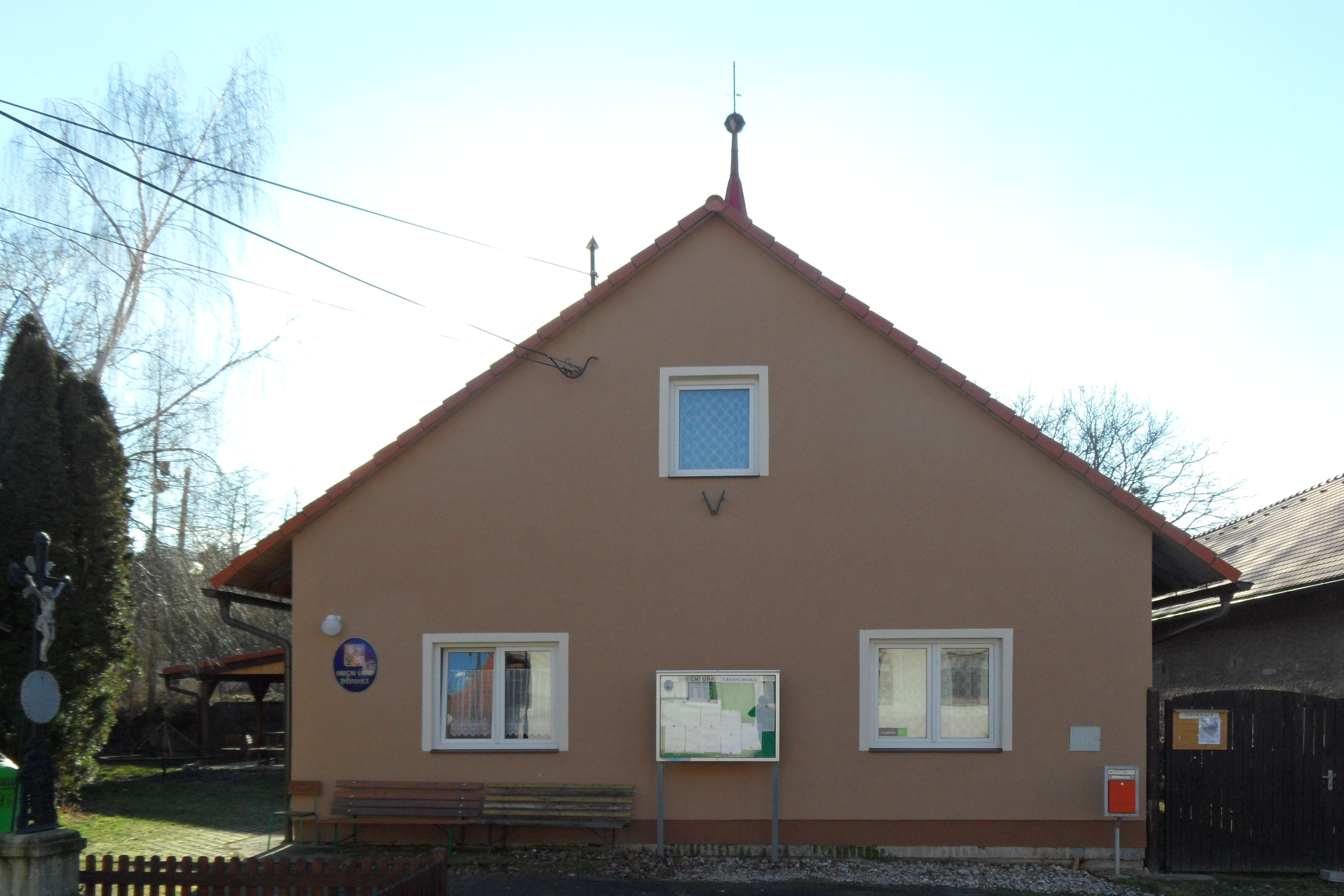
- Municipal office

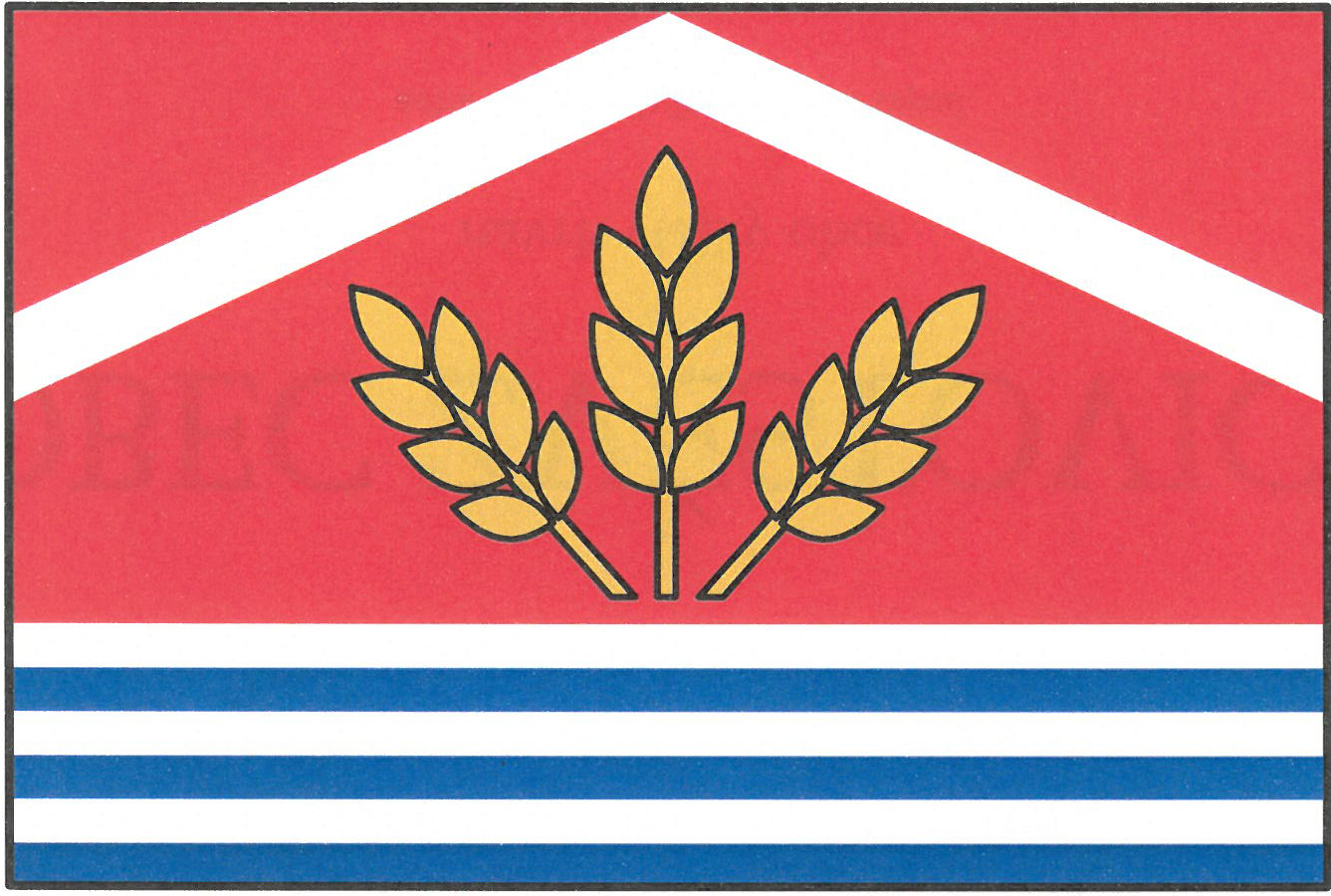
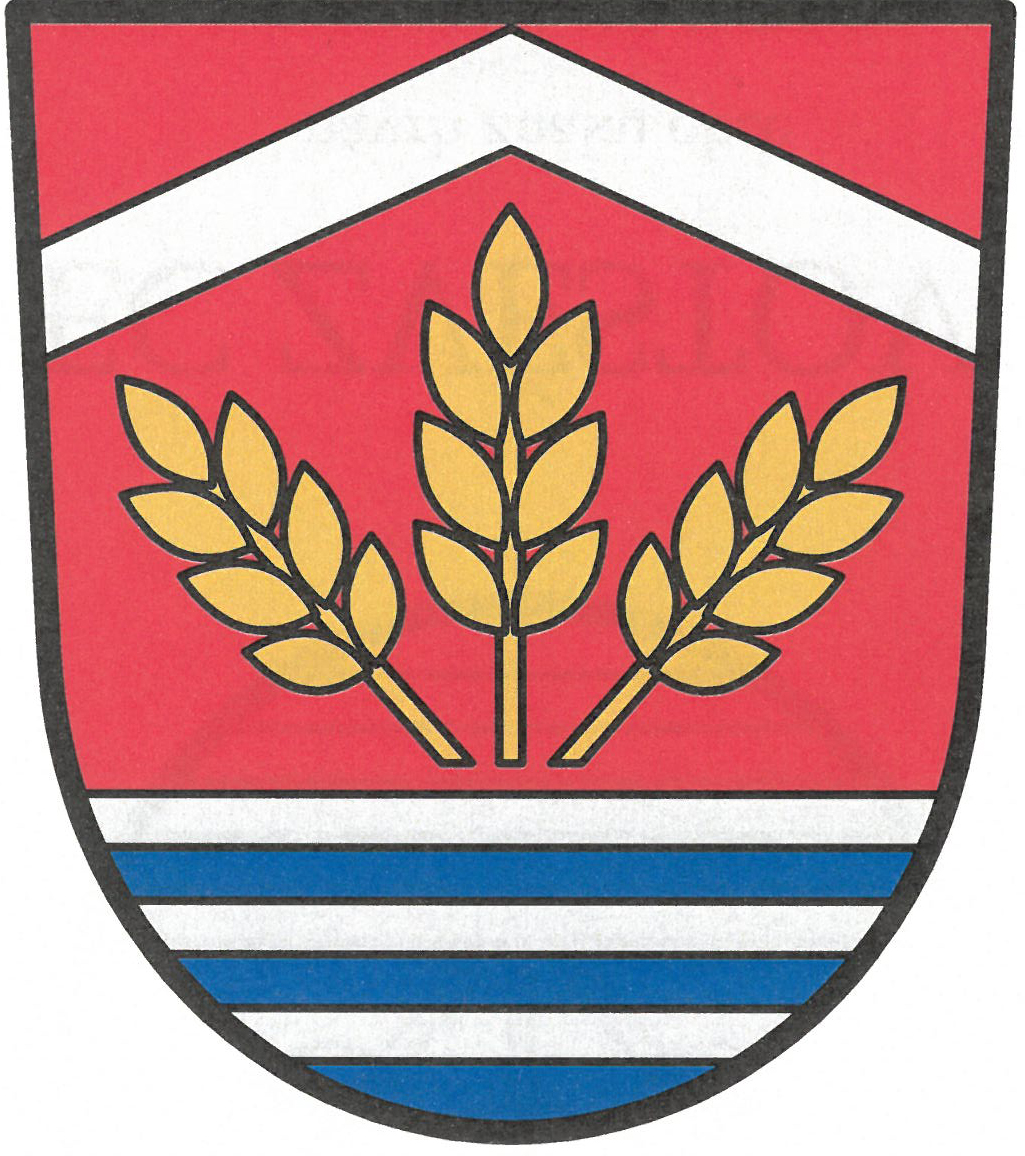
- Flag Coat of arms

- Location in the Czech Republic
- Coordinates: 49°50′53″N 15°30′46″E
- Country: Czech Republic
- Region: Vysočina
- District: Havlíčkův Brod
- First mentioned: 1557

Area
  - Total: 3.00 km^{2} (1.16 sq mi)
- Elevation: 288 m (945 ft)

Population (2026-01-01)
  - Total: 79
  - Density: 26/km^{2} (68/sq mi)
- Time zone: UTC+1 (CET)
  - Summer (DST): UTC+2 (CEST)
- Postal code: 582 82
- Website: www.zvestovice.cz

Zvěstovice is a municipality and village in Havlíčkův Brod District in the Vysočina Region of the Czech Republic. It has about 80 inhabitants.

Zvěstovice lies approximately 28 kilometres (17 mi) north of Havlíčkův Brod, 51 km (32 mi) north of Jihlava, and 83 km (52 mi) east of Prague.

== Demographics ==
Historical population
Year	Pop.	±%
1869	247	—
1880	278	+12.6%
1890	268	−3.6%
1900	263	−1.9%
1910	307	+16.7%
1921	356	+16.0%
1930	330	−7.3%
1950	217	−34.2%
1961	202	−6.9%
1970	159	−21.3%
1980	127	−20.1%
1991	77	−39.4%
2001	68	−11.7%
2011	70	+2.9%
2021	69	−1.4%
Source: Censuses
