= Horní Krupá =

- Municipality
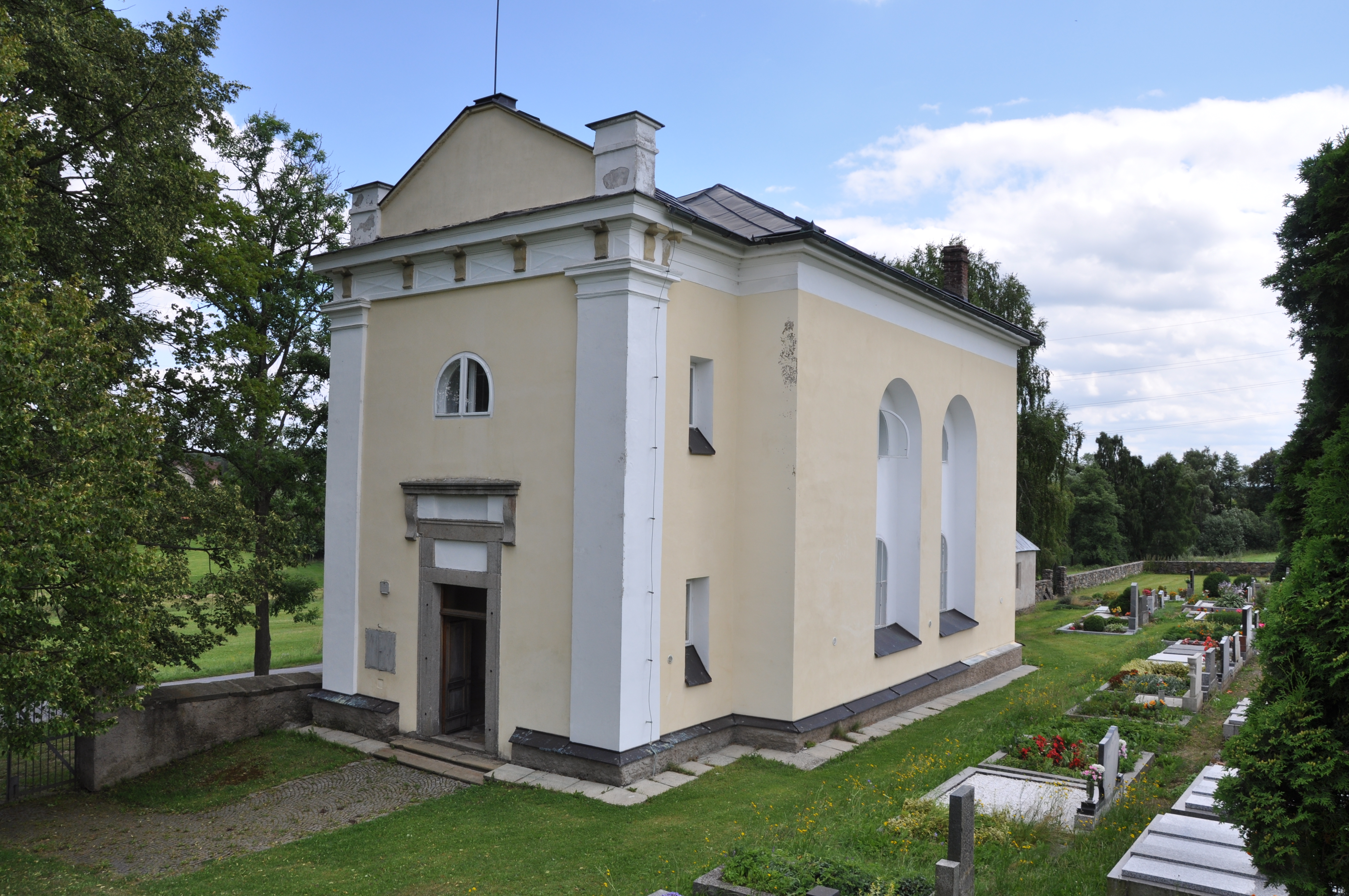
- Evangelical church

- Flag Coat of arms

- Location in the Czech Republic
- Coordinates: 49°40′19″N 15°35′19″E
- Country: Czech Republic
- Region: Vysočina
- District: Havlíčkův Brod
- First mentioned: 1283

Area
  - Total: 11.30 km^{2} (4.36 sq mi)
- Elevation: 477 m (1,565 ft)

Population (2026-01-01)
  - Total: 609
  - Density: 53.9/km^{2} (140/sq mi)
- Time zone: UTC+1 (CET)
  - Summer (DST): UTC+2 (CEST)
- Postal codes: 580 01
- Website: www.hornikrupa.cz

Horní Krupá is a municipality and village in Havlíčkův Brod District in the Vysočina Region of the Czech Republic. It has about 600 inhabitants.

Horní Krupá lies approximately 9 kilometres (6 mi) north of Havlíčkův Brod, 32 km (20 mi) north of Jihlava, and 95 km (59 mi) south-east of Prague.

== Administrative division ==
Horní Krupá consists of four municipal parts (in brackets population according to the 2021 census):

- Horní Krupá (459)
- Lysá (9)
- Údolí (43)
- Zálesí (58)

== Demographics ==
Historical population
Year	Pop.	±%
1869	650	—
1880	706	+8.6%
1890	642	−9.1%
1900	559	−12.9%
1910	597	+6.8%
1921	579	−3.0%
1930	558	−3.6%
1950	462	−17.2%
1961	463	+0.2%
1970	456	−1.5%
1980	444	−2.6%
1991	413	−7.0%
2001	456	+10.4%
2011	501	+9.9%
2021	569	+13.6%
Source: Censuses
