= Břevnice =

- Municipality
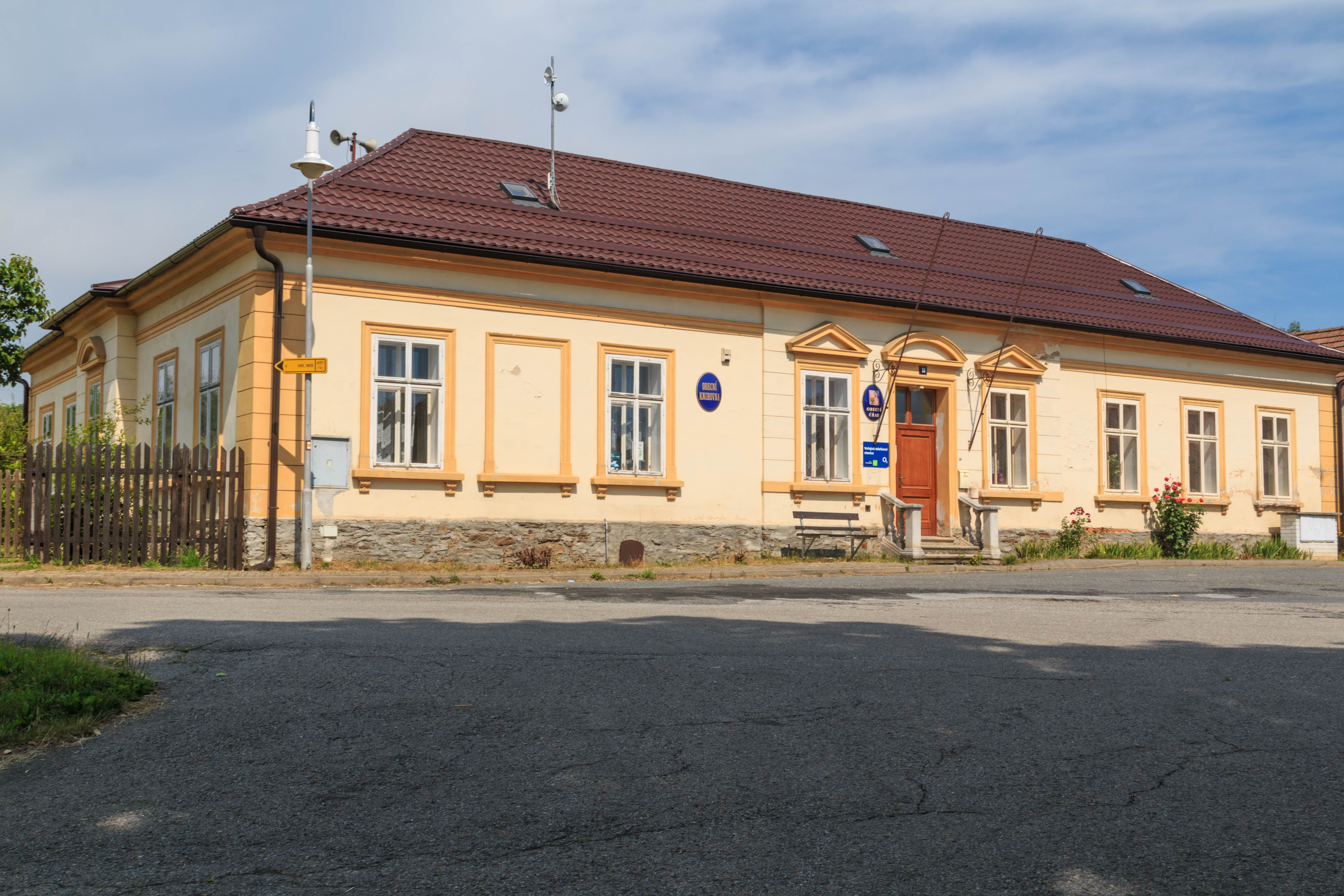
- Municipal office

- Flag Coat of arms

- Location in the Czech Republic
- Coordinates: 49°37′53″N 15°36′45″E
- Country: Czech Republic
- Region: Vysočina
- District: Havlíčkův Brod
- First mentioned: 1351

Area
  - Total: 3.37 km^{2} (1.30 sq mi)
- Elevation: 435 m (1,427 ft)

Population (2026-01-01)
  - Total: 168
  - Density: 49.9/km^{2} (129/sq mi)
- Time zone: UTC+1 (CET)
  - Summer (DST): UTC+2 (CEST)
- Postal code: 580 01
- Website: www.obecbrevnice.cz

Břevnice (Czech pronunciation: [ˈbr̝ɛvɲɪtsɛ]; German: Hrzebnicz) is a municipality and village in Havlíčkův Brod District in the Vysočina Region of the Czech Republic. It has about 200 inhabitants.

Břevnice lies approximately 5 kilometres (3 mi) north-east of Havlíčkův Brod, 28 km (17 mi) north of Jihlava, and 99 km (62 mi) south-east of Prague.

== Demographics ==
Historical population
Year	Pop.	±%
1869	294	—
1880	257	−12.6%
1890	208	−19.1%
1900	198	−4.8%
1910	241	+21.7%
1921	241	+0.0%
1930	233	−3.3%
1950	185	−20.6%
1961	205	+10.8%
1970	201	−2.0%
1980	165	−17.9%
1991	164	−0.6%
2001	164	+0.0%
2011	168	+2.4%
2021	168	+0.0%
Source: Censuses
