= Modlíkov =

- Municipality
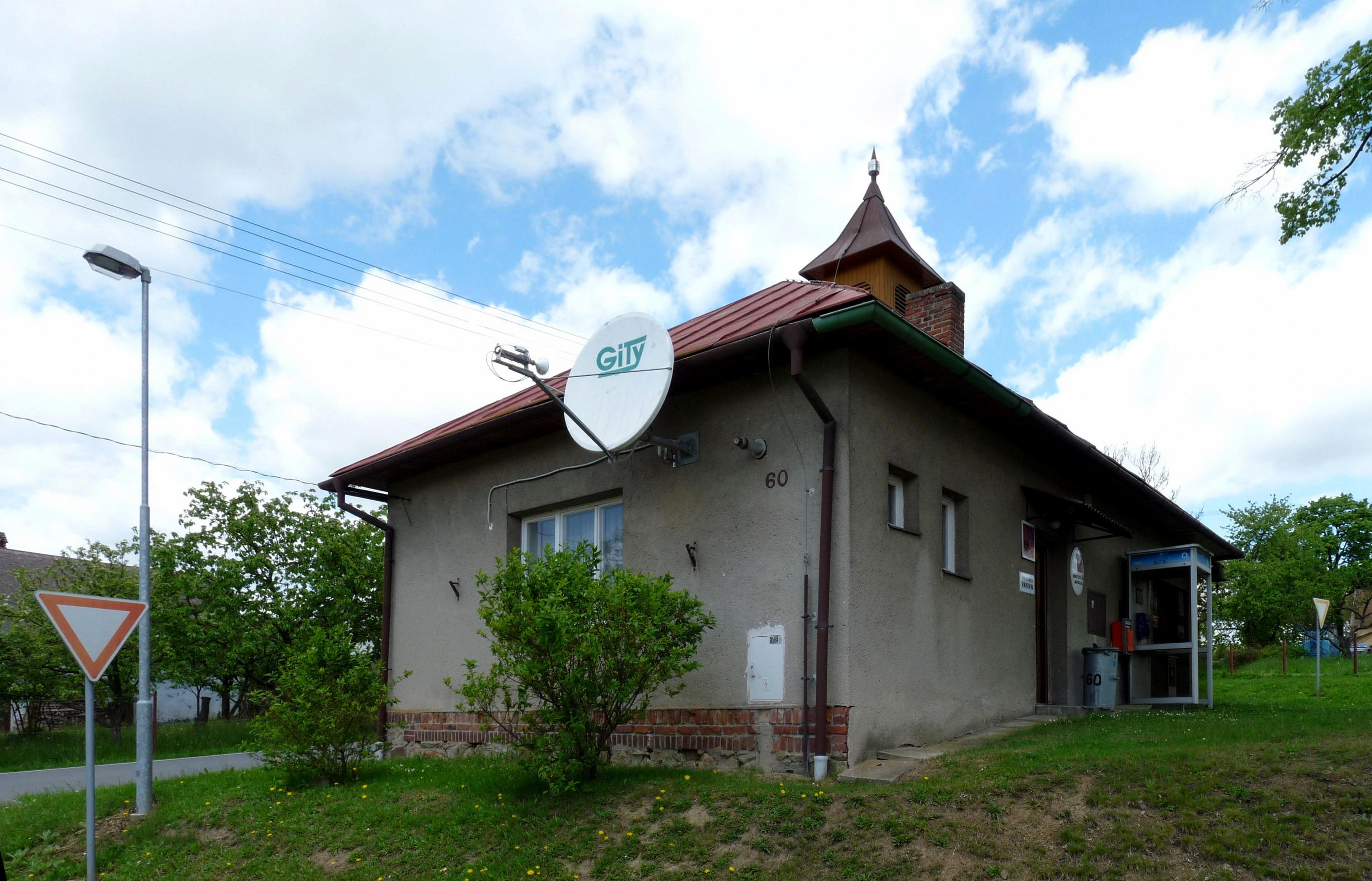
- Municipal office

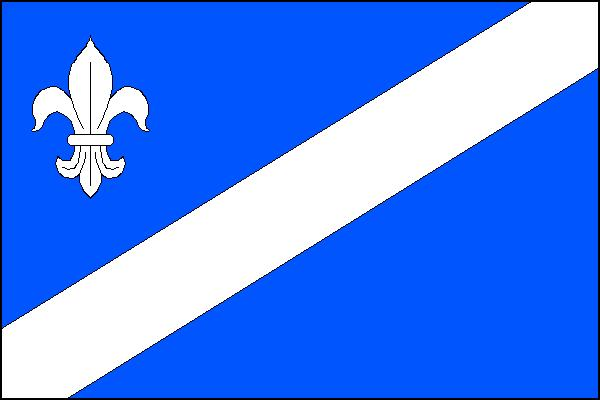
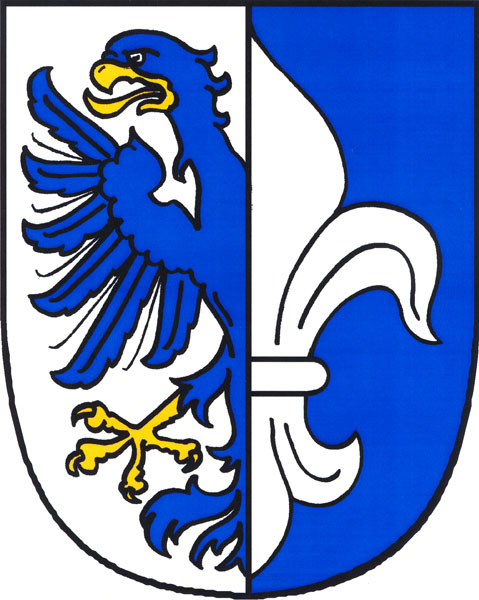
- Flag Coat of arms

- Location in the Czech Republic
- Coordinates: 49°36′30″N 15°46′13″E
- Country: Czech Republic
- Region: Vysočina
- District: Havlíčkův Brod
- First mentioned: 1366

Area
  - Total: 5.09 km^{2} (1.97 sq mi)
- Elevation: 568 m (1,864 ft)

Population (2026-01-01)
  - Total: 153
  - Density: 30.1/km^{2} (77.9/sq mi)
- Time zone: UTC+1 (CET)
  - Summer (DST): UTC+2 (CEST)
- Postal code: 582 22
- Website: www.modlikov.cz

Modlíkov is a municipality and village in Havlíčkův Brod District in the Vysočina Region of the Czech Republic. It has about 200 inhabitants.

Modlíkov lies approximately 15 kilometres (9 mi) east of Havlíčkův Brod, 28 km (17 mi) north-east of Jihlava, and 111 km (69 mi) south-east of Prague.

== Demographics ==
Historical population
Year	Pop.	±%
1869	306	—
1880	303	−1.0%
1890	283	−6.6%
1900	275	−2.8%
1910	252	−8.4%
1921	268	+6.3%
1930	264	−1.5%
1950	215	−18.6%
1961	223	+3.7%
1970	218	−2.2%
1980	191	−12.4%
1991	142	−25.7%
2001	154	+8.5%
2011	172	+11.7%
2021	155	−9.9%
Source: Censuses
