= Nová Ves u Světlé =

- Municipality
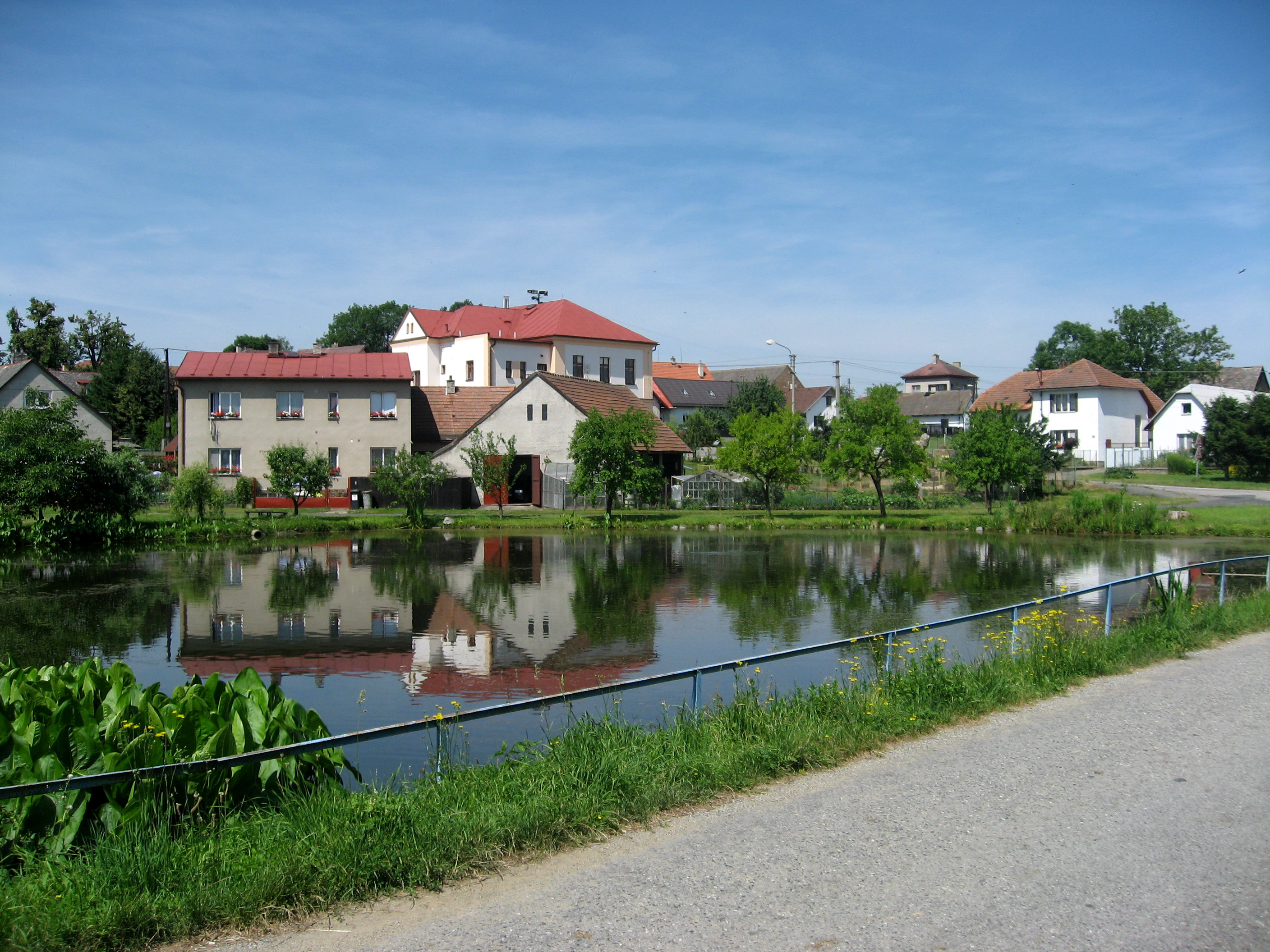
- Centre of Nová Ves u Světlé

- Flag Coat of arms

- Location in the Czech Republic
- Coordinates: 49°38′56″N 15°26′16″E
- Country: Czech Republic
- Region: Vysočina
- District: Havlíčkův Brod
- First mentioned: 1378

Area
  - Total: 7.59 km^{2} (2.93 sq mi)
- Elevation: 445 m (1,460 ft)

Population (2026-01-01)
  - Total: 549
  - Density: 72.3/km^{2} (187/sq mi)
- Time zone: UTC+1 (CET)
  - Summer (DST): UTC+2 (CEST)
- Postal code: 582 91
- Website: www.novavesusvetle.cz

Nová Ves u Světlé (German: Thunisch Neudorf) is a municipality and village in Havlíčkův Brod District in the Vysočina Region of the Czech Republic. It has about 500 inhabitants.

== Demographics ==
Historical population
Year	Pop.	±%
1869	445	—
1880	574	+29.0%
1890	551	−4.0%
1900	573	+4.0%
1910	684	+19.4%
1921	662	−3.2%
1930	666	+0.6%
1950	531	−20.3%
1961	534	+0.6%
1970	508	−4.9%
1980	430	−15.4%
1991	436	+1.4%
2001	461	+5.7%
2011	483	+4.8%
2021	530	+9.7%
Source: Censuses
