= Jitkov =

- Municipality
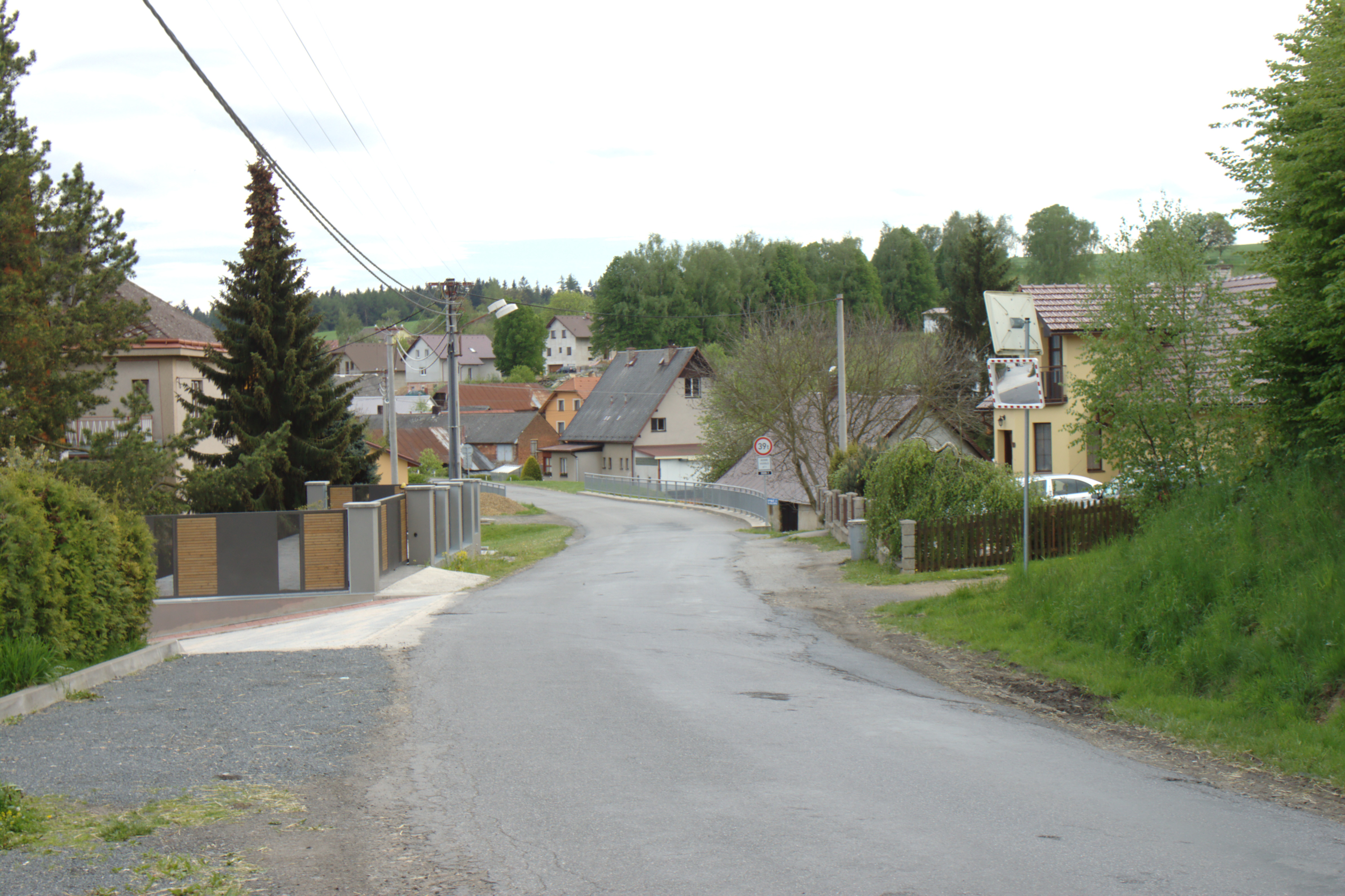
- Main road

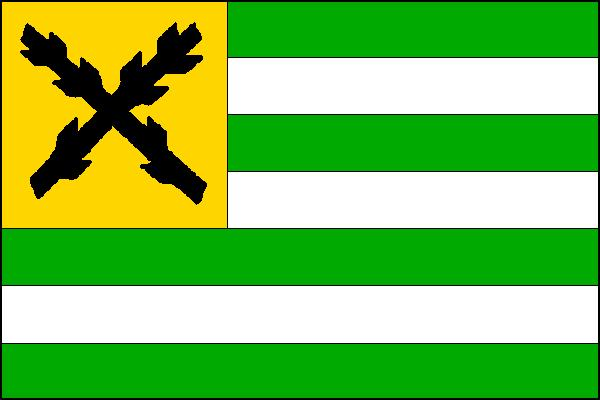
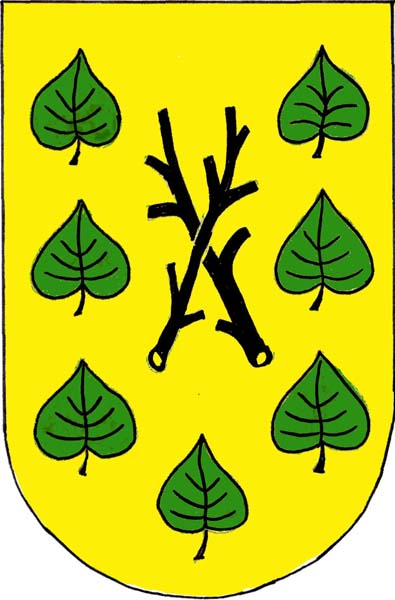
- Flag Coat of arms

- Location in the Czech Republic
- Coordinates: 49°39′44″N 15°43′38″E
- Country: Czech Republic
- Region: Vysočina
- District: Havlíčkův Brod
- First mentioned: 1269

Area
  - Total: 4.56 km^{2} (1.76 sq mi)
- Elevation: 538 m (1,765 ft)

Population (2026-01-01)
  - Total: 251
  - Density: 55.0/km^{2} (143/sq mi)
- Time zone: UTC+1 (CET)
  - Summer (DST): UTC+2 (CEST)
- Postal code: 583 01
- Website: www.obec-jitkov.cz

Jitkov is a municipality and village in Havlíčkův Brod District in the Vysočina Region of the Czech Republic. It has about 300 inhabitants.

Jitkov lies approximately 13 kilometres (8 mi) north-east of Havlíčkův Brod, 32 km (20 mi) north of Jihlava, and 106 km (66 mi) south-east of Prague.

== Demographics ==
Historical population
Year	Pop.	±%
1869	548	—
1880	524	−4.4%
1890	551	+5.2%
1900	504	−8.5%
1910	511	+1.4%
1921	501	−2.0%
1930	425	−15.2%
1950	322	−24.2%
1961	338	+5.0%
1970	286	−15.4%
1980	214	−25.2%
1991	186	−13.1%
2001	176	−5.4%
2011	212	+20.5%
2021	226	+6.6%
Source: Censuses
