= Krátká Ves =

- Municipality
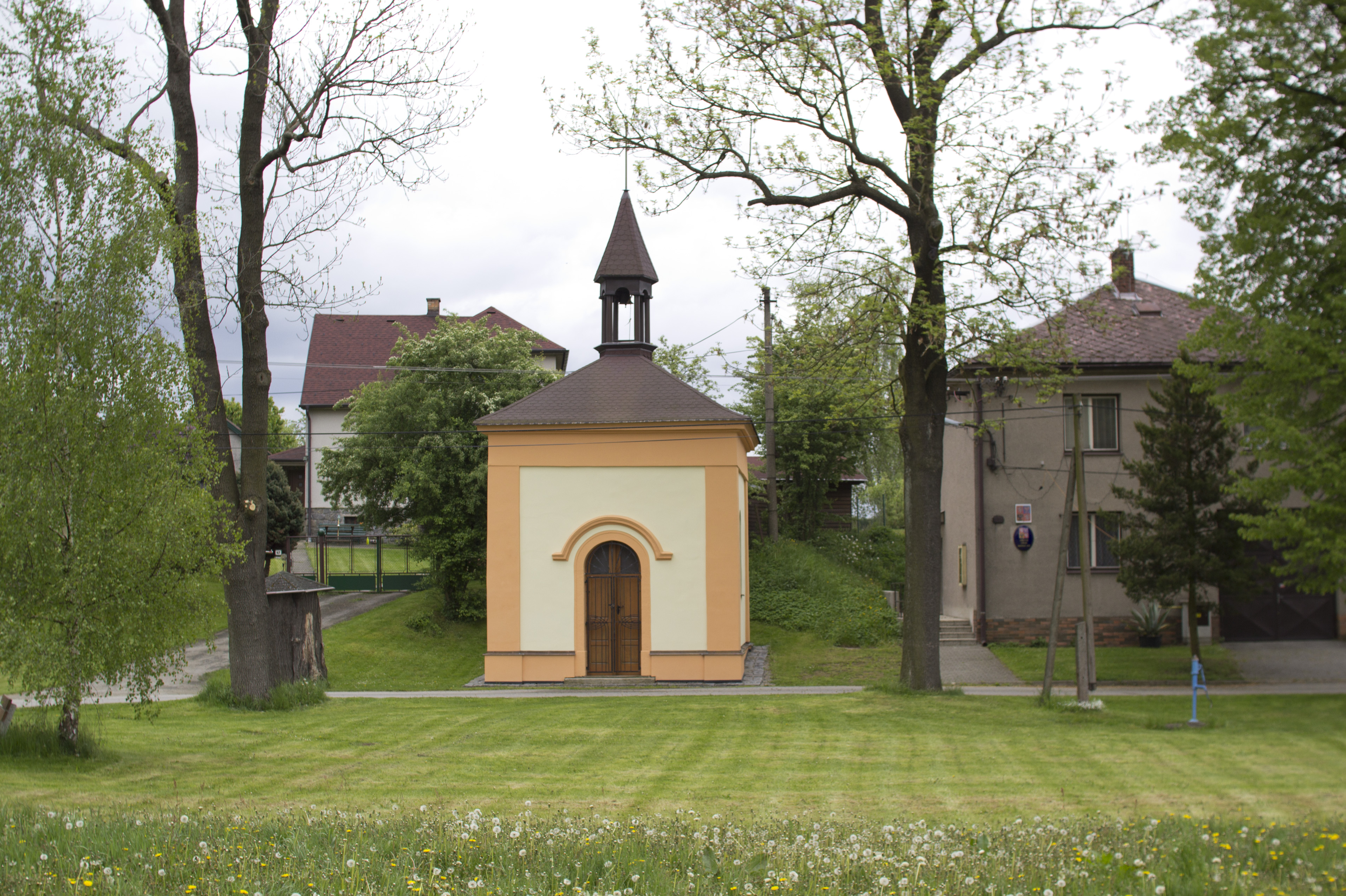
- Chapel and municipal office

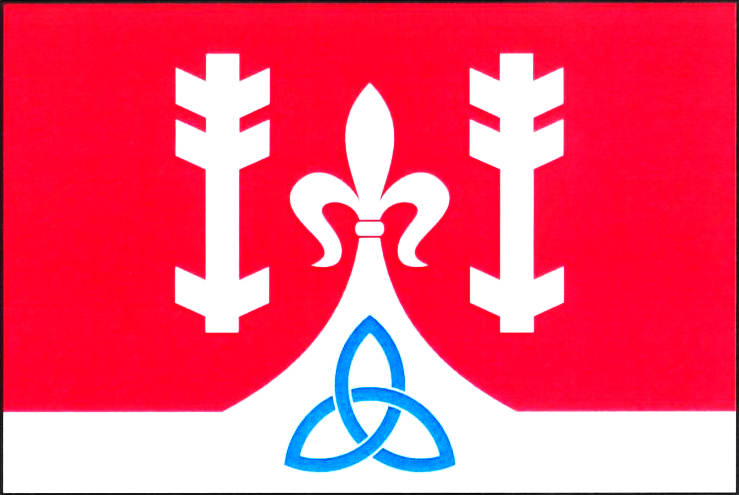
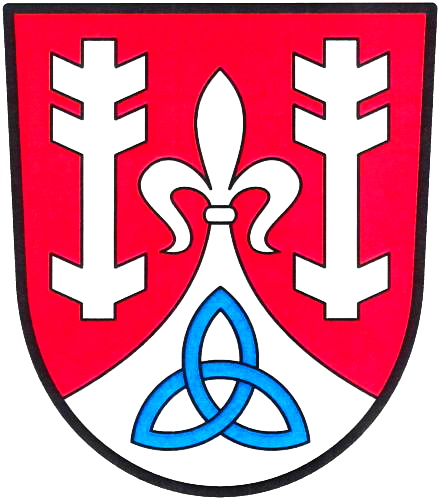
- Flag Coat of arms

- Location in the Czech Republic
- Coordinates: 49°37′33″N 15°41′4″E
- Country: Czech Republic
- Region: Vysočina
- District: Havlíčkův Brod
- First mentioned: 1303

Area
  - Total: 5.70 km^{2} (2.20 sq mi)
- Elevation: 498 m (1,634 ft)

Population (2026-01-01)
  - Total: 127
  - Density: 22.3/km^{2} (57.7/sq mi)
- Time zone: UTC+1 (CET)
  - Summer (DST): UTC+2 (CEST)
- Postal code: 582 22
- Website: kratkaves.cz

Krátká Ves is a municipality and village in Havlíčkův Brod District in the Vysočina Region of the Czech Republic. It has about 100 inhabitants.

Krátká Ves lies approximately 9 kilometres (6 mi) east of Havlíčkův Brod, 27 km (17 mi) north of Jihlava, and 105 km (65 mi) south-east of Prague.

== Demographics ==
Historical population
Year	Pop.	±%
1869	306	—
1880	315	+2.9%
1890	305	−3.2%
1900	265	−13.1%
1910	280	+5.7%
1921	283	+1.1%
1930	274	−3.2%
1950	224	−18.2%
1961	227	+1.3%
1970	189	−16.7%
1980	182	−3.7%
1991	159	−12.6%
2001	144	−9.4%
2011	146	+1.4%
2021	119	−18.5%
Source: Censuses
