= Skorkov (Havlíčkův Brod District) =

- Municipality
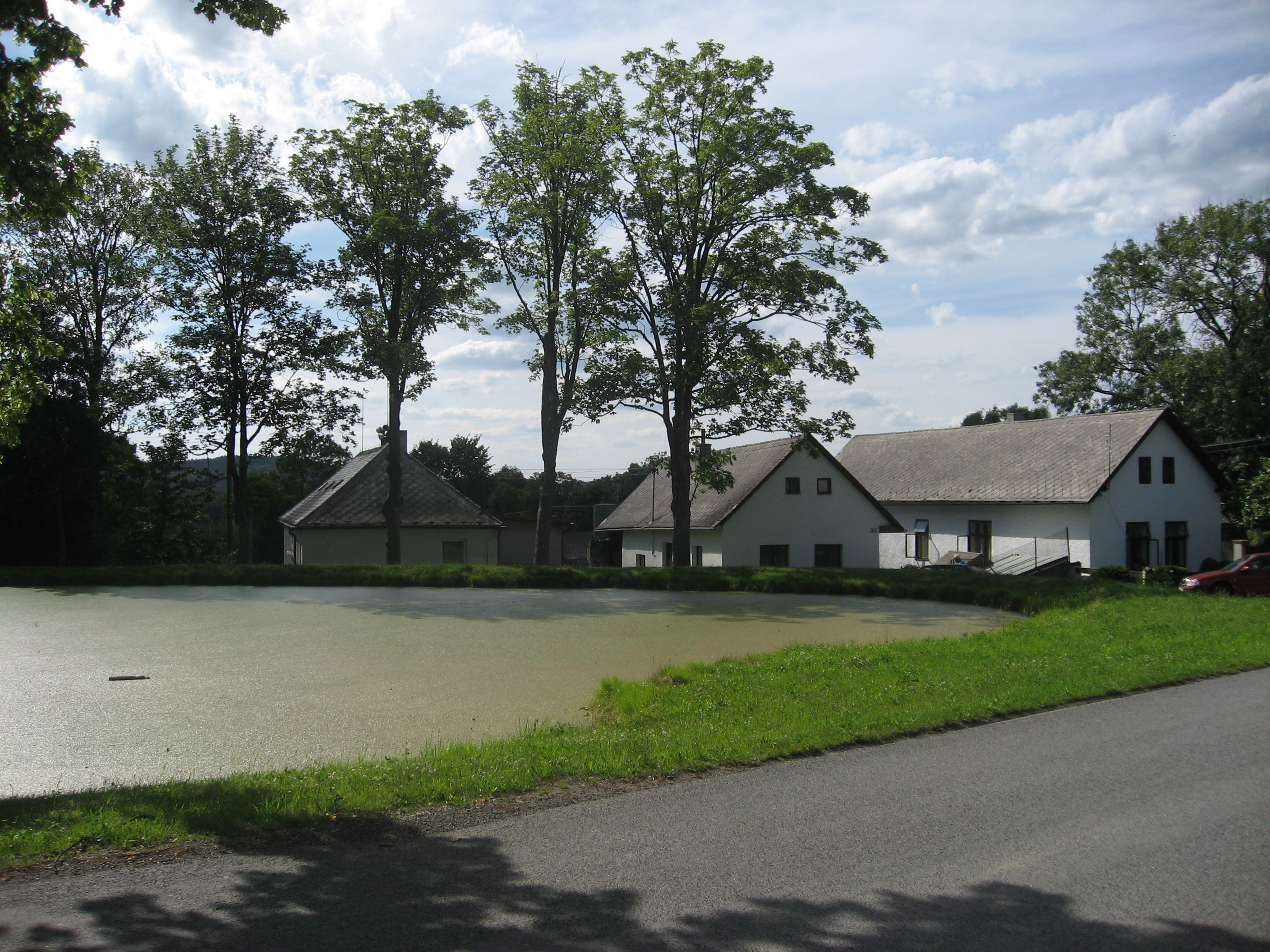
- Pond in Skorkov

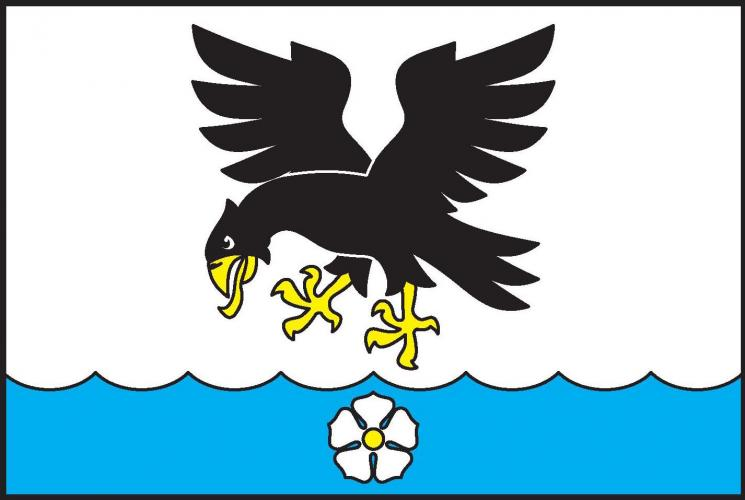
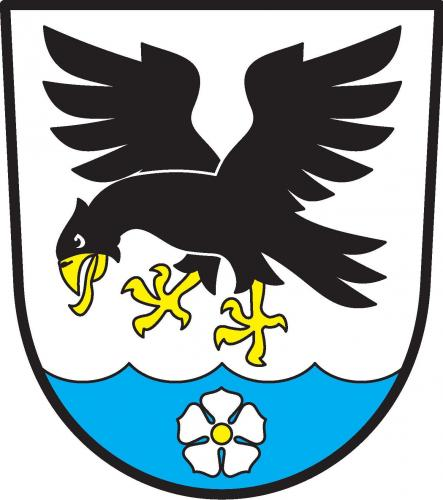
- Flag Coat of arms

- Location in the Czech Republic
- Coordinates: 49°30′30″N 15°28′32″E
- Country: Czech Republic
- Region: Vysočina
- District: Havlíčkův Brod
- First mentioned: 1379

Area
  - Total: 6.21 km^{2} (2.40 sq mi)
- Elevation: 580 m (1,900 ft)

Population (2026-01-01)
  - Total: 111
  - Density: 17.9/km^{2} (46.3/sq mi)
- Time zone: UTC+1 (CET)
  - Summer (DST): UTC+2 (CEST)
- Postal code: 582 53
- Website: obecskorkov.cz

Skorkov is a municipality and village in Havlíčkův Brod District in the Vysočina Region of the Czech Republic. It has about 100 inhabitants.

== Demographics ==
Historical population
Year	Pop.	±%
1869	346	—
1880	385	+11.3%
1890	378	−1.8%
1900	347	−8.2%
1910	362	+4.3%
1921	342	−5.5%
1930	342	+0.0%
1950	227	−33.6%
1961	225	−0.9%
1970	176	−21.8%
1980	140	−20.5%
1991	105	−25.0%
2001	84	−20.0%
2011	75	−10.7%
2021	90	+20.0%
Source: Censuses
