= Čejkovice =

Čejkovice may refer to places in the Czech Republic:

- Čejkovice (České Budějovice District), a municipality and village in the South Bohemian Region
- Čejkovice (Hodonín District), a municipality and village in the South Moravian Region
- Čejkovice (Kutná Hora District), a municipality and village in the Central Bohemian Region
- Čejkovice (Znojmo District), a municipality and village in the South Moravian Region
- Čejkovice, a village and part of Libědice in the Ústí nad Labem Region
- Čejkovice, a village and part of Mladoňovice (Chrudim District) in the Pardubice Region
- Čejkovice, a village and part of Podhradí (Jičín District) in the Hradec Králové Region
