= Sázava (river) =

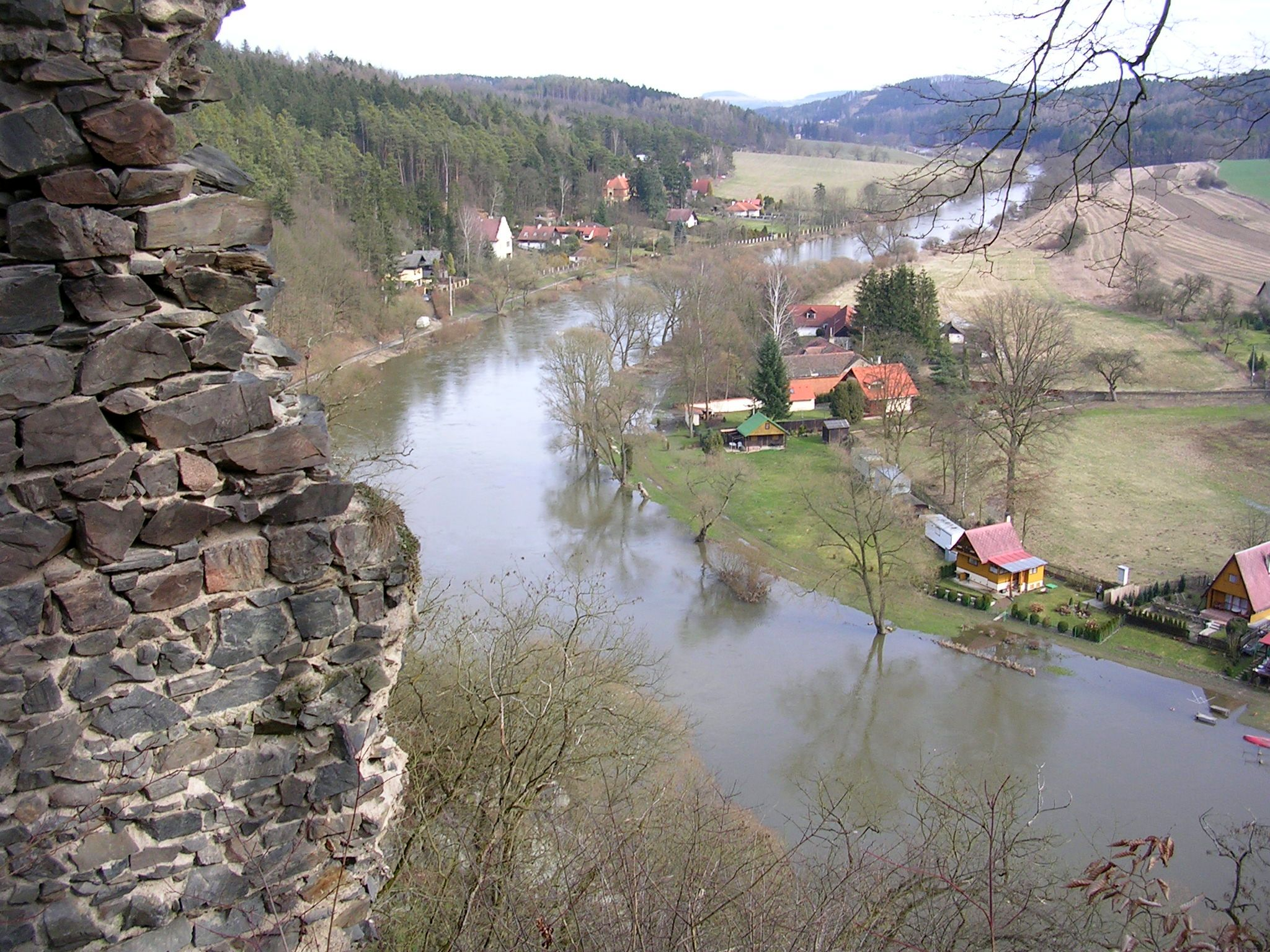
- The Sázava in Zbořený Kostelec

Location
- Country: Czech Republic
- Regions: Vysočina; Central Bohemian

Physical characteristics
- Source
  - location: Cikháj, Upper Svratka Highlands
  - coordinates: 49°40′18″N 15°56′8″E
  - elevation: 757 m (2,484 ft)
- Mouth
  - location: Vltava
  - coordinates: 49°53′12″N 14°23′36″E
  - elevation: 200 m (660 ft)
- Length: 225.9 km (140.4 mi)
- Basin size: 4,349.8 km^{2} (1,679.5 sq mi)
- Discharge
  - average: 25.2 m^{3}/s (890 cu ft/s) near estuary

Basin features
- Progression: Vltava→ Elbe→ North Sea

The Sázava (Czech pronunciation: [ˈsaːzava]) is a river in the Czech Republic, a right tributary of the Vltava River. It flows through the Vysočina and Central Bohemian regions. It is 225.9 km (140.4 mi) long, making it the 6th longest river in the Czech Republic.

== Etymology ==
The first written mention of the river is from 1045, when it was called Zazoa in a Latin text. Other early spellings of the name were Zazaua and Sassava. There are several theories about the origin of the name. One of the more likely theories says that the name could be derived from the Proto-Slavic verb sadjati (modern Czech sázet, usazovat), meaning 'to sediment', 'to sink to the bottom'. According to another theory, the name has its basis in the Celtic word sathá, which meant 'grove', 'forest', as well as 'swarming', 'flickering'.

== Characteristic ==
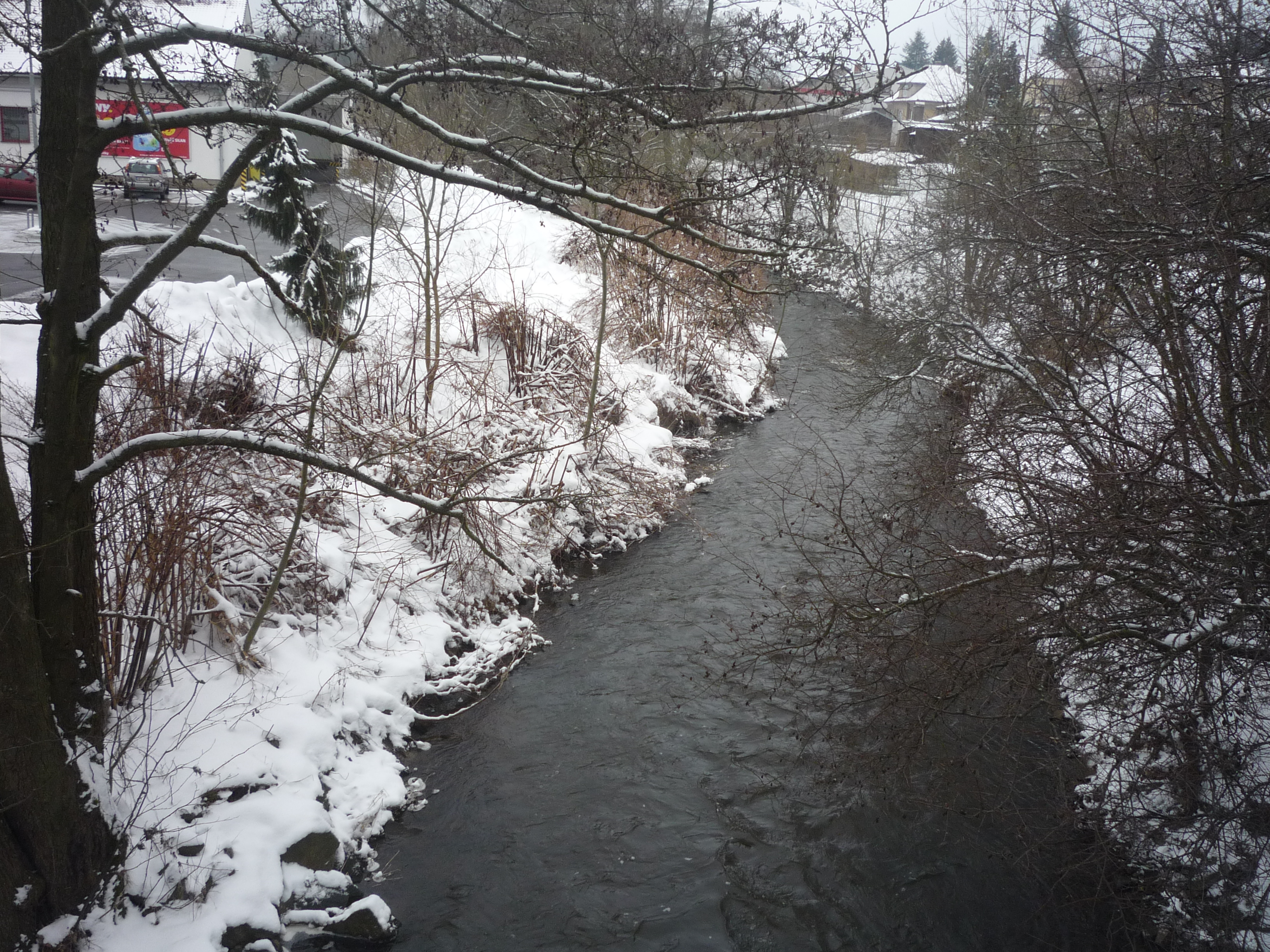
The Sázava in Žďár nad Sázavou

The Sázava originates in Cikháj in the Upper Svratka Highlands at an elevation of 757 m (2,484 ft) and flows to Davle, where it enters the Vltava River at an elevation of 200 m (660 ft). It is 225.9 km (140.4 mi) long, making it the 6th longest river in the Czech Republic. Its drainage basin has an area of 4,349.8 km^{2} (1,679.5 sq mi).

The longest tributaries of the Sázava are:

Tributary	Length (km)	River km	Side
Želivka	103.9	98.8	left
Blanice	66.0	78.6	left
Šlapanka	39.0	164.4	left
Konopišťský potok	33.0	31.3	left
Sázavka	32.2	144.8	right
Janovický potok	28.1	19.2	left
Perlový potok	23.1	153.3	left
Jevanský potok	20.9	48.7	right
Úsobský potok	20.7	156.9	left
Pstružný potok	18.8	141.1	left
Štěpánovský potok	18.7	95.9	left
Břevnický potok	18.5	166.6	right
Křešický potok	18.2	72.0	left

== Course ==
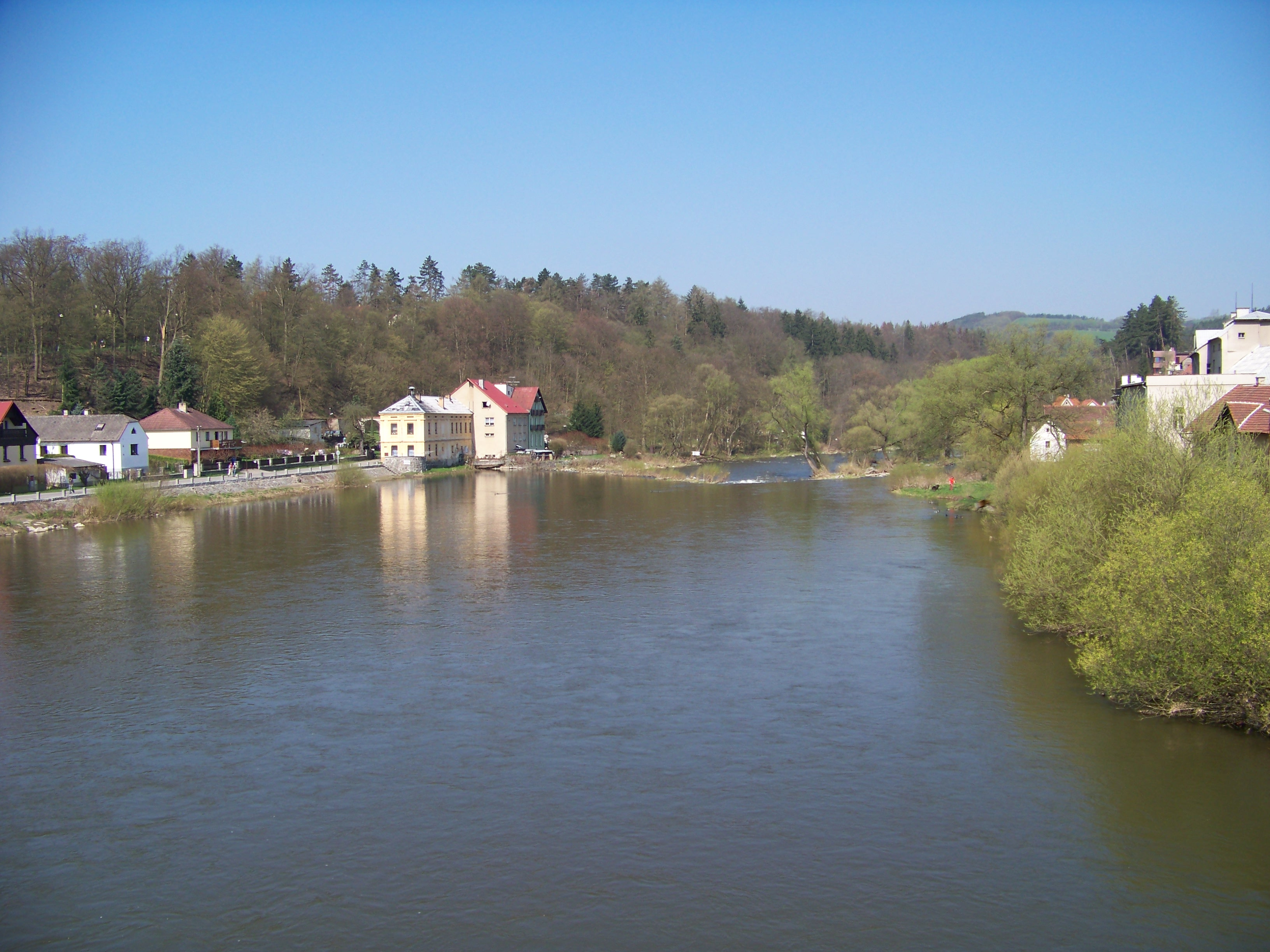
The Sázava in Kamenný Přívoz

The most notable settlements on the river are the towns of Žďár nad Sázavou and Havlíčkův Brod. The river meanders in a generally north-westerly direction and flows past Polnička, Žďár nad Sázavou, Hamry nad Sázavou, Sázava (Žďár nad Sázavou District), Nové Dvory, Přibyslav, Pohled, Havlíčkův Brod, Okrouhlice, Pohleď, Světlá nad Sázavou, Trpišovice, Vilémovice, Ledeč nad Sázavou and Chřenovice.

After it crosses the border between the Vysočina and Central Bohemian regions, it flows past Vlastějovice, Horka II, Zruč nad Sázavou, Kácov, Tichonice, Soběšín, Český Šternberk, Rataje nad Sázavou, Ledečko, Samopše and Sázava (Benešov District). From here it flows generally westward, past Stříbrná Skalice, Chocerady, Hvězdonice, Senohraby, Čtyřkoly, Čerčany, Poříčí nad Sázavou, Nespeky, Týnec nad Sázavou, Krhanice, Kamenný Přívoz, reaching its confluence with the Vltava (at the latter's 78.3 km mark) at the boundary between Hradištko and Davle, about 10 km (6 mi) south of the municipal border of Prague.

== Bodies of water ==
There are 6,661 bodies of water in the basin area; the largest of them is the Švihov Reservoir with an area of 1,603 ha (3,960 acres), built on the Želivka. The most notable body of water directly on the Sázava is the Velké Dářko fish pond with an area of 206 ha (510 acres).

== Fauna ==
The river is a biocentre and biocorridor for many animal species. Endangered species that live here include the common kingfisher, Eurasian otter, Amur bitterling, thick shelled river mussel, depressed river mussel and river orb mussel.

== Tourism ==
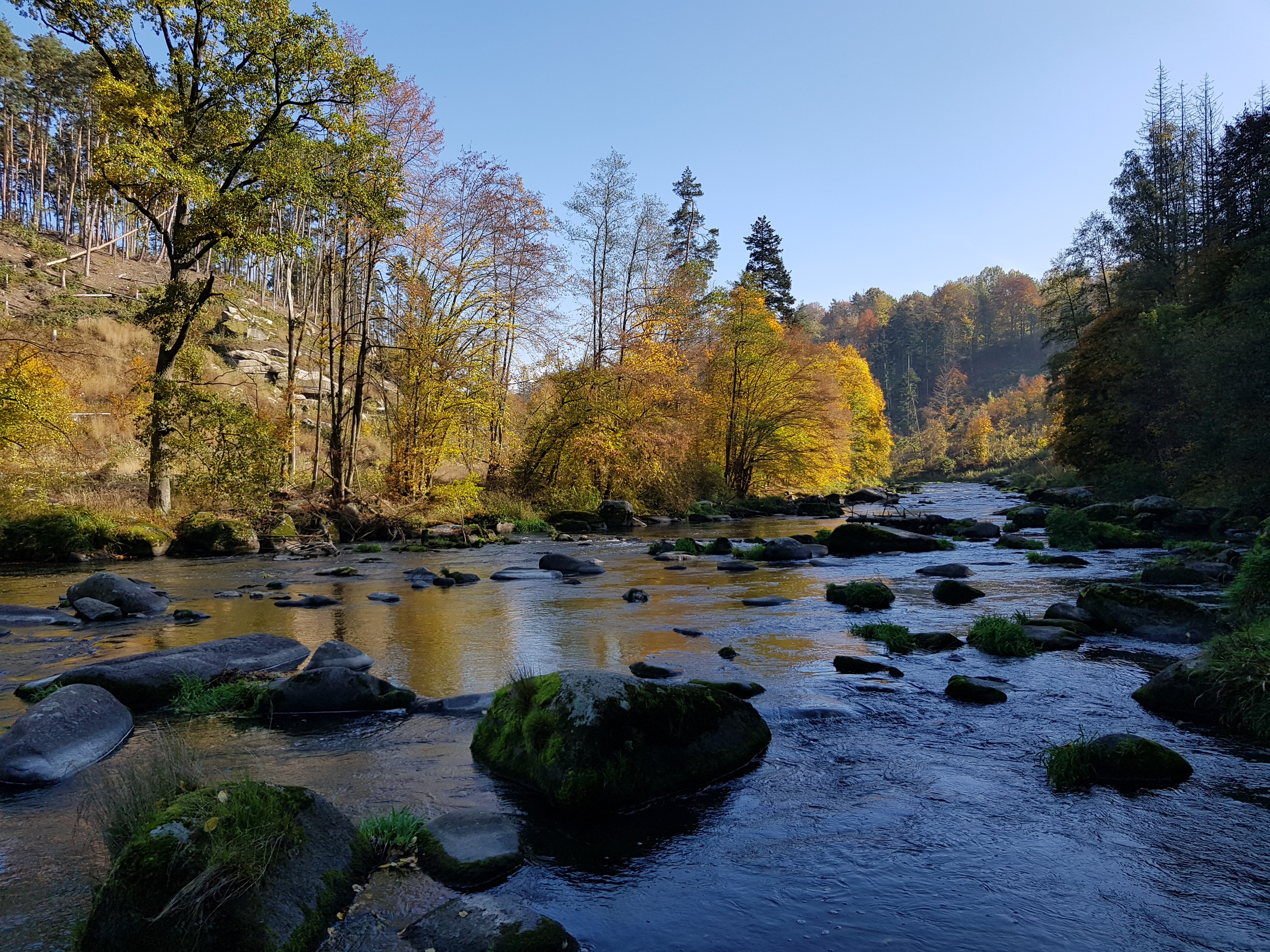
Stvořidla Nature Reserve

The Sázava is considered one of the most beautiful rivers in the country and is among the most popular rivers for river tourism. The area around the river is associated with the Czech tramping movement. About 208 km (129 mi) of the river from Žďár nad Sázavou to the mouth is navigable. The most popular section is Týnec nad Sázavou–Pikovice. Between Světlá nad Sázavou and Ledeč nad Sázavou is the Stvořidla Nature Reserve with the most difficult rapids in the Czech Republic.
