= Žampach =

Žampach is name of several locations in the Czech Republic:

- Žampach (Ústí nad Orlicí District), a municipality and village in the Pardubice Region
- Žampach, a village and administrative part of Jílové u Prahy in the Central Bohemian Region
  - Žampach viaduct, a stone bridge in this village
- Žampach, a village and administrative part of Kamenný Přívoz in the Central Bohemian Region
