= Pohled =

Pohled or Pohleď may refer to places in the Czech Republic:

- Pohled (Havlíčkův Brod District), a municipality and village in the Vysočina Region
- Pohleď, a municipality and village in the Vysočina Region
- Pohled, a village and part of Mladoňovice (Chrudim District) in the Pardubice Region
