= Stržanov =

- Village
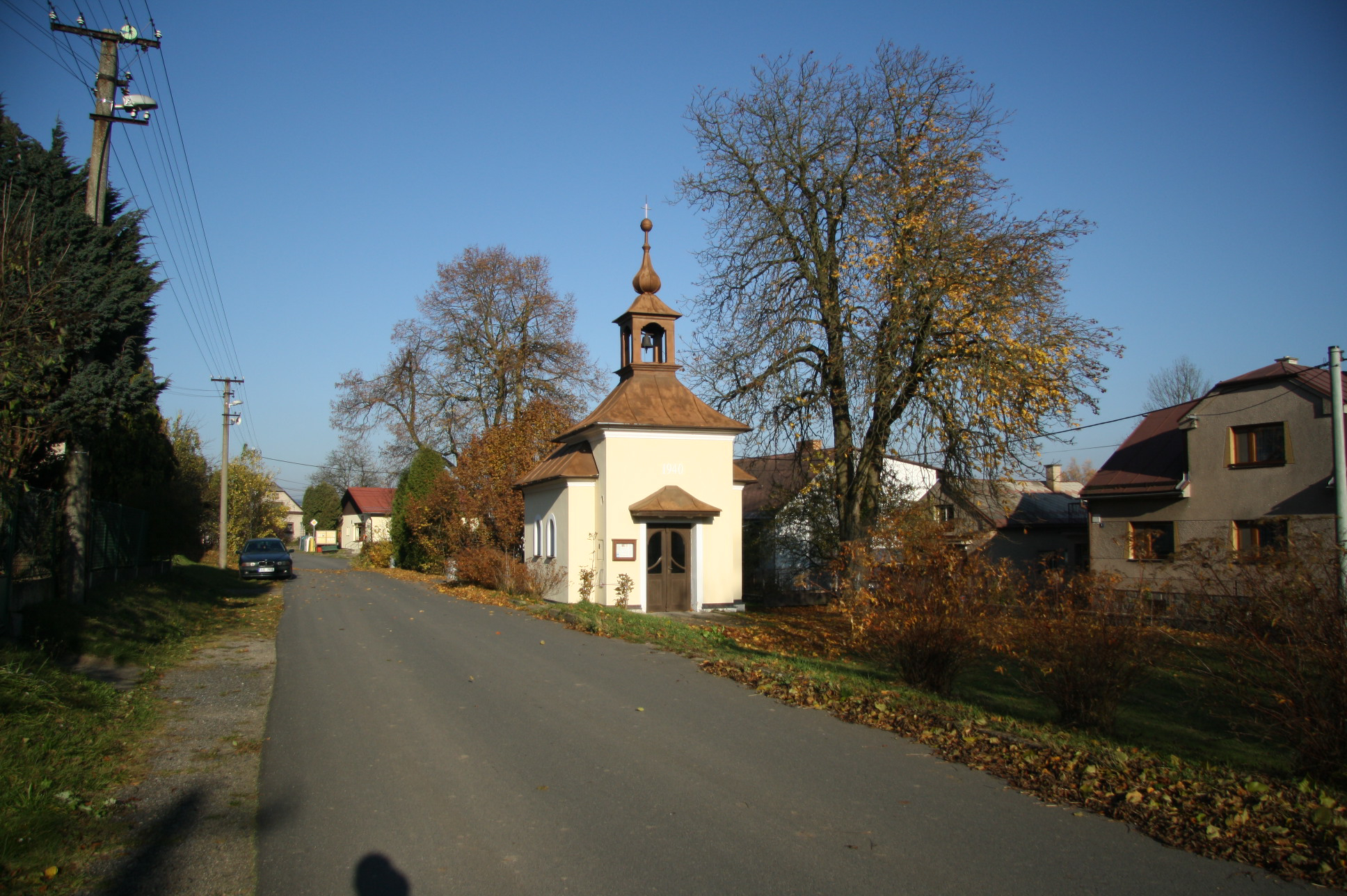
- Chapel of Saint Anthony of Padua

- Location in the Czech Republic
- Coordinates: 49°36′13″N 15°56′28″E
- Country: Czech Republic
- Region: Vysočina
- District: Žďár nad Sázavou
- Municipality: Žďár nad Sázavou
- First mentioned: 1483

Area
  - Total: 4.13 km^{2} (1.59 sq mi)
- Elevation: 605 m (1,985 ft)

Population (2021)
  - Total: 266
  - Density: 64.4/km^{2} (167/sq mi)
- Time zone: UTC+1 (CET)
  - Summer (DST): UTC+2 (CEST)
- Postal code: 591 02

Stržanov (German: Sterschanow) is a village and municipal part of Žďár nad Sázavou in Žďár nad Sázavou District in the Vysočina Region of the Czech Republic. It has about 260 inhabitants. It is located in the northern part of the town's territory.

== History ==
The first written mention of Stržanov is from 1483, when the village was property of the Žďár Monastery. In 1882–1883, a small village school was built there.

Between 1960 and 1980, Stržanov was administered as a part of Polnička. Since 1980, it has been a municipal part of Žďár nad Sázavou.

== Demographics ==
Historical population

Year	Pop.	±%
1869	455	—
1880	463	+1.8%
1890	434	−6.3%
1900	421	−3.0%
1910	399	−5.2%

Year	Pop.	±%
1921	360	−9.8%
1930	305	−15.3%
1950	244	−20.0%
1961	270	+10.7%
1970	237	−12.2%

Year	Pop.	±%
1980	234	−1.3%
1991	222	−5.1%
2001	230	+3.6%
2011	236	+2.6%
2021	266	+12.7%

Source: Censuses

== Transport ==
The road I/37 from Jaroměř to Velká Bíteš runs through the village.

== Sights ==
There are no protected cultural monuments in Stržanov, only the protection zone of the former Cistercian monastery in Žďár nad Sázavou with the Pilgrimage Church of Saint John of Nepomuk extends into Stržanov's area in the south.

By the road to Žďár nad Sázavou, there is a boundary stone from the year 1867 of the former border of Bohemia and Moravia, which ran through the village until 1946.

There is a Chapel of Saint Anthony of Padua in the centre of the village. It was built in 1940 and consecrated in 1950.
