= Jan Zrzavý =

Czech artist (1890–1977)

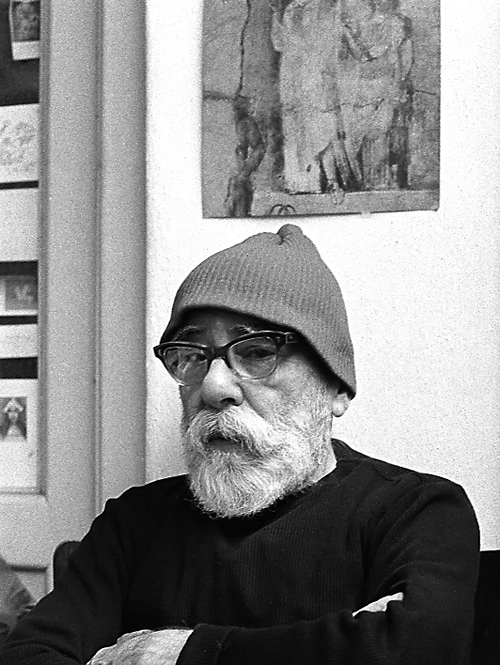
Jan Zrzavý in the 1960s

Jan Zrzavý (5 November 1890 – 12 October 1977) was a Czech painter, graphic artist and illustrator.

== Biography ==
Zrzavý was born on 5 November 1890 in Vadín in Bohemia (today a part of Okrouhlice in the Czech Republic). He studied privately in Prague and then attended the UMPRUM there for 2 years starting in 1907, before being expelled. He first visited France in 1907, returning to Paris and Brittany frequently until 1939, but maintaining close links to his homeland.

From 1942 to 1958, he lived and worked in Vodňany. After the war he became an associate professor at Palacký University of Olomouc from 1947 to 1950. Later he maintained private studios in Prague and Okrouhlice. He grew increasingly recognized on a national and international level in the 1950s and 1960s and was honoured a title of a National Artist in 1965.

He died in Prague on 12 October 1977, at the age of 86. At his request, he was buried in Krucemburk, which he liked to visit and where his father came from.

== Artistic influences ==
Zrzavý was a key member of the Czech, and more broadly European, modernism movement the early part of the 20th century. Although he is regarded as a symbolist, he was heavily influenced by European Medieval art. Throughout his life he was also inspired by spectacular landscapes, both abroad (France, Italy, and Greece) as well as in his native country (Vodňany, Okrouhlice, Prague). He reworked many of his themes multiple times. He was admired by and written about by one of the founders of the Czech artistic movement called Poetism, Karel Teige.

His œuvre dedicated to the Czech National Gallery is on display in Telč and in Prague.

== Art groups and clubs ==
- Sursum, 1910 – founder
- SVU Mánes, 1917 – member
- Tvrdošíjní (Stubborns) – co-founder
