= Okrouhlice =

- Municipality
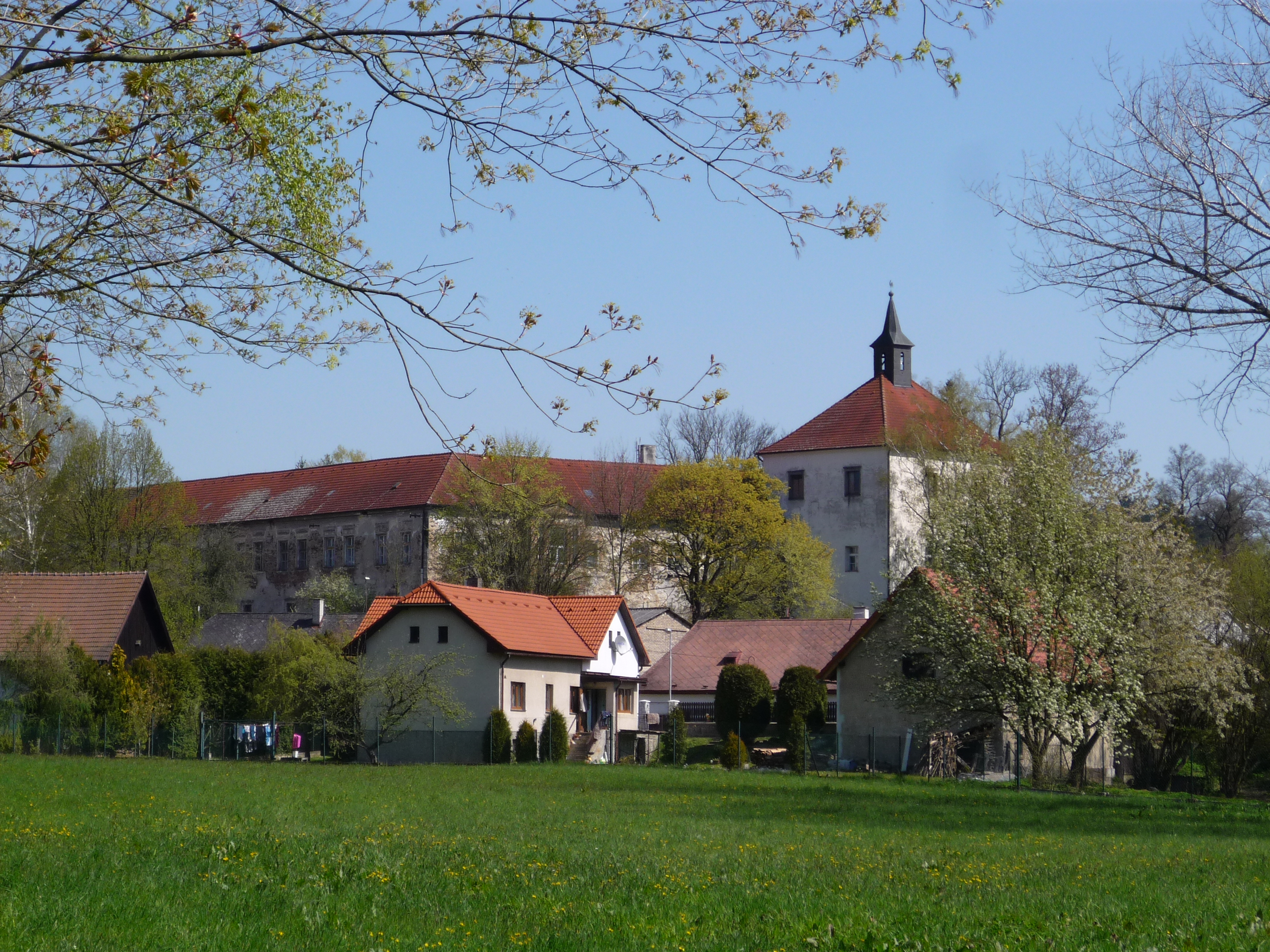
- Okrouhlice Castle

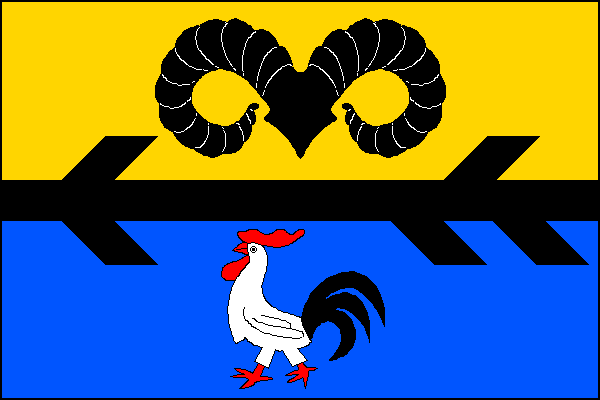
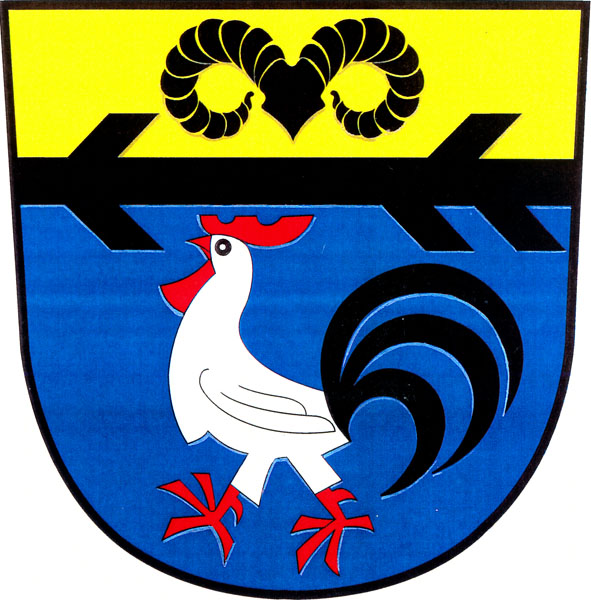
- Flag Coat of arms

- Location in the Czech Republic
- Coordinates: 49°37′48″N 15°29′27″E
- Country: Czech Republic
- Region: Vysočina
- District: Havlíčkův Brod
- First mentioned: 1207

Area
  - Total: 18.58 km^{2} (7.17 sq mi)
- Elevation: 405 m (1,329 ft)

Population (2026-01-01)
  - Total: 1,374
  - Density: 73.95/km^{2} (191.5/sq mi)
- Time zone: UTC+1 (CET)
  - Summer (DST): UTC+2 (CEST)
- Postal codes: 580 01, 582 31
- Website: www.obec-okrouhlice.cz

Okrouhlice is a municipality and village in Havlíčkův Brod District in the Vysočina Region of the Czech Republic. It has about 1,400 inhabitants.

== Administrative division ==
Okrouhlice consists of five municipal parts (in brackets population according to the 2021 census):

- Okrouhlice (755)
- Babice (187)
- Chlístov (107)
- Olešnice (191)
- Vadín (118)

== Etymology ==
The name is derived from the Czech adjective okrouhlá, i.e. 'round'. It could have referred to the shape of the village, a nearby meadow or a nearby hill.

== Geography ==
Okrouhlice is located about 6 kilometres (4 mi) west of Havlíčkův Brod and 26 km (16 mi) north of Jihlava. It lies in the Upper Sázava Hills. The highest point is at 477 m (1,565 ft) above sea level. The Sázava River flows through the municipality.

== History ==
The first written mention of Okrouhlice is in a deed of the monastery in Vilémov from 1207. It was founded during the colonisation in the second half of the 12th century.

== Demographics ==
Historical population

Year	Pop.	±%
1869	1,331	—
1880	1,401	+5.3%
1890	1,256	−10.3%
1900	1,387	+10.4%
1910	1,519	+9.5%

Year	Pop.	±%
1921	1,521	+0.1%
1930	1,561	+2.6%
1950	1,448	−7.2%
1961	1,519	+4.9%
1970	1,423	−6.3%

Year	Pop.	±%
1980	1,304	−8.4%
1991	1,185	−9.1%
2001	1,218	+2.8%
2011	1,278	+4.9%
2021	1,358	+6.3%

Source: Censuses

== Transport ==
Okrouhlice is located on the railway line Havlíčkův Brod–Ledeč nad Sázavou.

== Sights ==
The main landmark is the Okrouhlice Castle. Originally it was a Gothic fortress from the 14th century, which was rebuilt into a simple Renaissance castle. At the end of the 17th century, it was extended by a second wing.

== Notable people ==
- Jan Zrzavý (1890–1977), painter
