= Sázava (Žďár nad Sázavou District) =

- Municipality
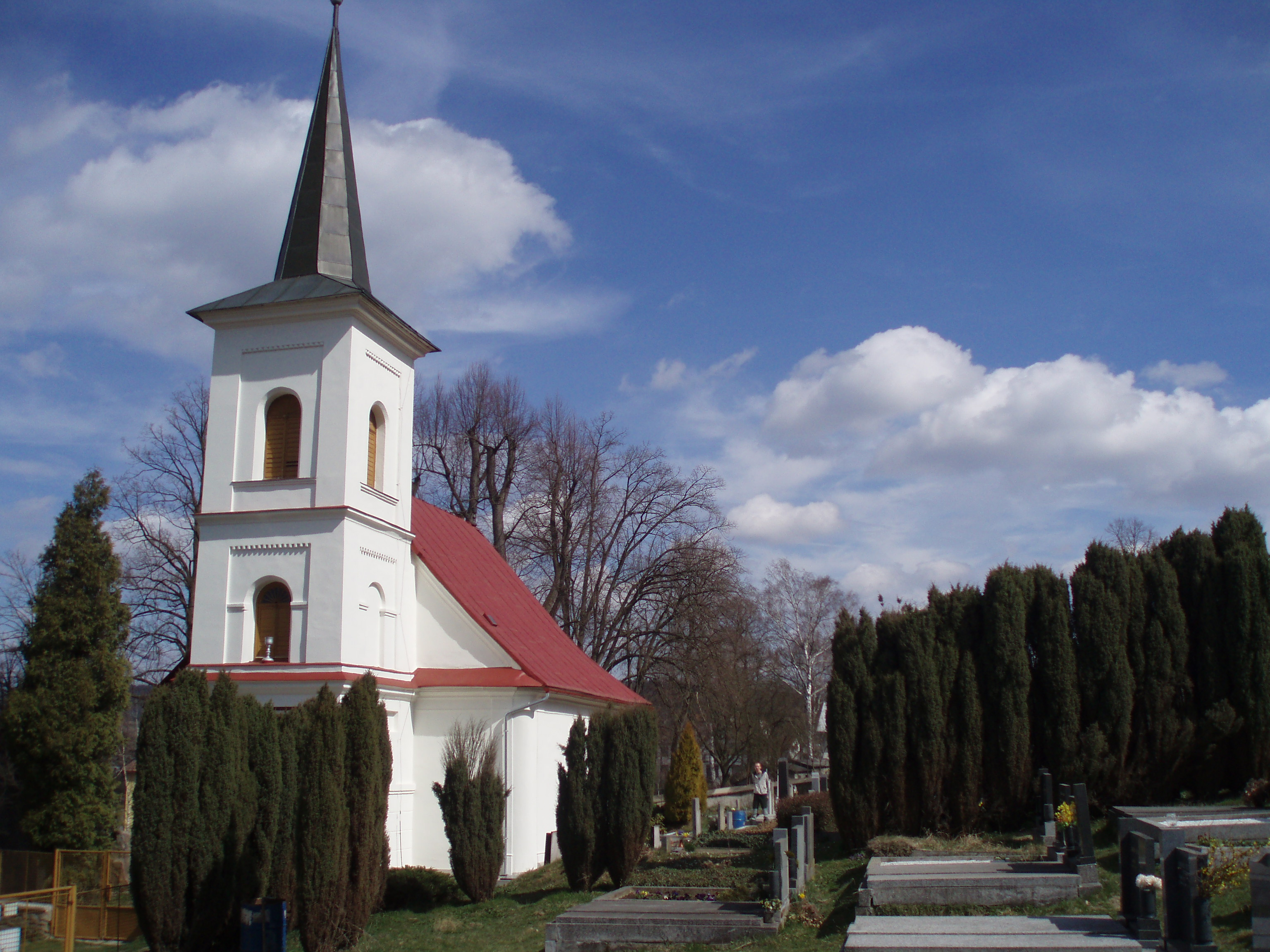
- Evangelical church

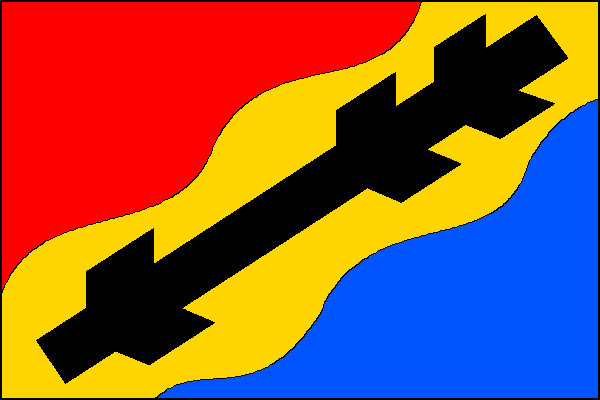
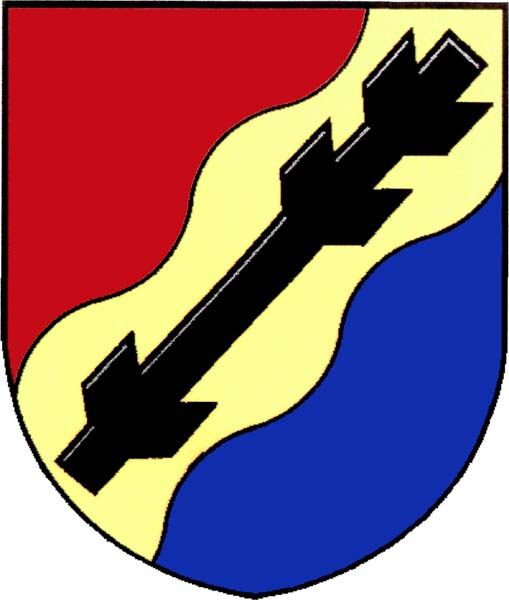
- Flag Coat of arms

- Location in the Czech Republic
- Coordinates: 49°33′35″N 15°51′27″E
- Country: Czech Republic
- Region: Vysočina
- District: Žďár nad Sázavou
- First mentioned: 1406

Area
  - Total: 7.56 km^{2} (2.92 sq mi)
- Elevation: 507 m (1,663 ft)

Population (2026-01-01)
  - Total: 672
  - Density: 88.9/km^{2} (230/sq mi)
- Time zone: UTC+1 (CET)
  - Summer (DST): UTC+2 (CEST)
- Postal code: 592 11
- Website: www.obecsazava.cz

Sázava is a municipality and village in Žďár nad Sázavou District in the Vysočina Region of the Czech Republic. It has about 700 inhabitants. It lies on the Sázava River.

== Administrative division ==
Sázava consists of two municipal parts (in brackets population according to the 2021 census):

- Sázava (602)
- Česká Mez (35)

== Etymology ==
The name was most likely derived from the eponymous river that flows through the village.

== Geography ==
Sázava is located about 5 kilometres (3 mi) west of Žďár nad Sázavou and 26 km (16 mi) northeast of Jihlava. It lies on the border between the Křižanov Highlands and Upper Sázava Hills. The highest point is the hill Rosička at 645 m (2,116 ft) above sea level. The Sázava River flows through the municipality.

== History ==
The first written mention of Sázava is from 1406, when a hammer mill and a fortress stood here. From 1562, Sázava belonged to the Polná-Přibyslav estate.

== Demographics ==
Historical population

Year	Pop.	±%
1869	600	—
1880	627	+4.5%
1890	584	−6.9%
1900	600	+2.7%
1910	570	−5.0%

Year	Pop.	±%
1921	559	−1.9%
1930	588	+5.2%
1950	648	+10.2%
1961	583	−10.0%
1970	561	−3.8%

Year	Pop.	±%
1980	581	+3.6%
1991	582	+0.2%
2001	571	−1.9%
2011	605	+6.0%
2021	637	+5.3%

Source: Censuses

== Transport ==
The I/19 road (the section from Havlíčkův Brod to Žďár nad Sázavou) runs through the municipality.

Sázava is served by the railway station Sázava u Žďáru, located on the line Havlíčkův Brod–Žďár nad Sázavou. However, the station is situated just outside the municipal territory.

== Sights ==
The main landmark of Sázava is the Evangelical church. It was built in 1785.
