= Jílové u Prahy =

- Town
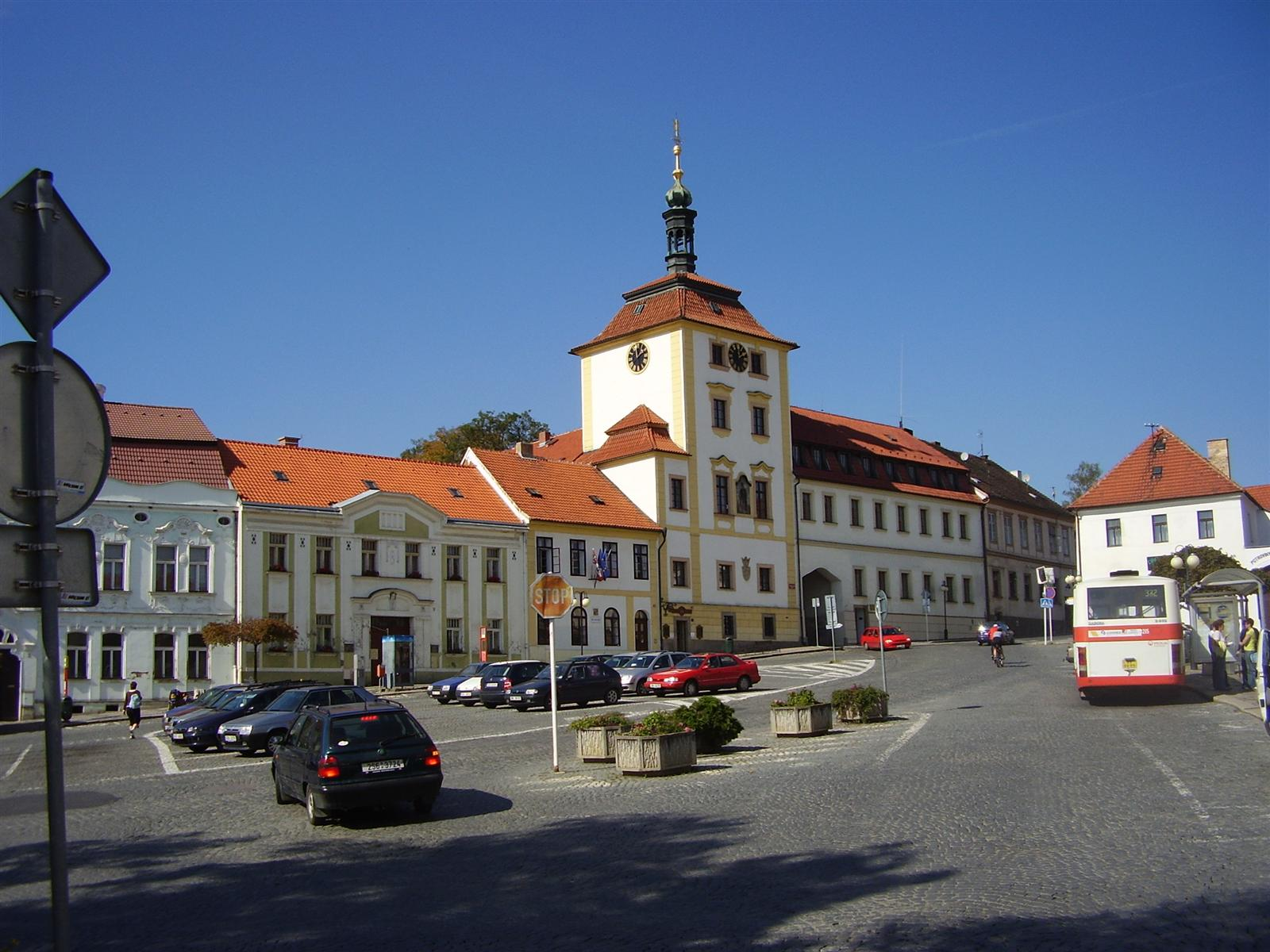
- Town square with the town hall

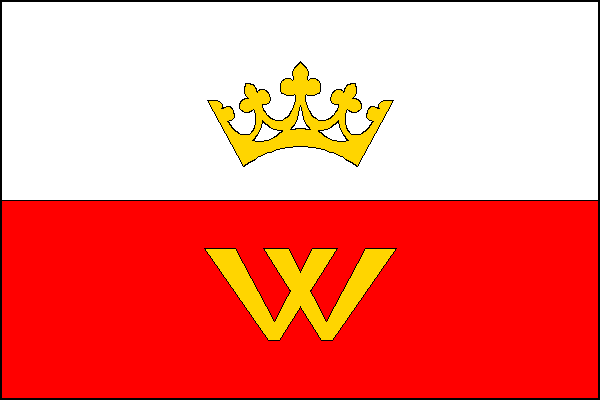
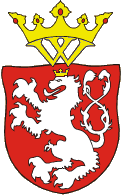
- Flag Coat of arms

- Location in the Czech Republic
- Coordinates: 49°53′53″N 14°29′34″E
- Country: Czech Republic
- Region: Central Bohemian
- District: Prague-West
- First mentioned: 1310

Government
  - Mayor: Pavel Pešek

Area
  - Total: 16.25 km^{2} (6.27 sq mi)
- Elevation: 381 m (1,250 ft)

Population (2026-01-01)
  - Total: 5,301
  - Density: 326.2/km^{2} (844.9/sq mi)
- Time zone: UTC+1 (CET)
  - Summer (DST): UTC+2 (CEST)
- Postal code: 254 01
- Website: www.jilove.cz

Jílové u Prahy (Czech pronunciation: [ˈjiːlovɛː ˈu praɦɪ]; German: Eule) is a town in Prague-West District in the Central Bohemian Region of the Czech Republic. It has about 5,300 inhabitants. The town is located near the Sázava River in the Benešov Uplands.

Jílové u Prahy was founded in the 13th century and its early history was connected with gold mining. The historic town centre is well preserved and is protected as an urban monument zone.

== Administrative division ==
Jílové u Prahy consists of seven municipal parts (in brackets population according to the 2021 census):

- Jílové u Prahy (3,221)
- Borek (215)
- Kabáty (274)
- Luka pod Medníkem (347)
- Radlík (766)
- Studené (207)
- Žampach (19)

== Etymology ==
The original form of the town's name was Jílový. The Czech adjective jílový (from jíl, i.e. 'clay') was related to a hill at the foot of which gold was washed from the clay.

== Geography ==
Jílové u Prahy is located about 13 kilometres (8 mi) south of Prague. It lies in the Benešov Uplands. The highest point is the hill Lípový vrch at 457 m (1,499 ft) above sea level. The Sázava River forms the southern municipal border.

== History ==
The first written mention of Jílové is from 1310. It is proved its existence in the 13th century, when it was founded by merger of gold mining settlements. In 1350, Jílové was raised to a royal town by King Charles IV. The gold mining ended in the 15th century during the Hussite Wars and some mines were flooded. The mining and importance of Jílové was partly revived by King Vladislaus II, but another decline of the town came with the Thirty Years' War.

Although it was an unfavorable time for gold mining, the town began to prosper again in the 19th century. In 1897, the railway was built, and in 1900 the railway connection with Prague was finished.

== Demographics ==
Historical population

Year	Pop.	±%
1869	2,801	—
1880	2,693	−3.9%
1890	2,504	−7.0%
1900	2,465	−1.6%
1910	2,301	−6.7%

Year	Pop.	±%
1921	2,208	−4.0%
1930	2,494	+13.0%
1950	2,532	+1.5%
1961	2,974	+17.5%
1970	2,853	−4.1%

Year	Pop.	±%
1980	2,875	+0.8%
1991	3,285	+14.3%
2001	3,325	+1.2%
2011	4,367	+31.3%
2021	5,049	+15.6%

Source: Censuses

== Transport ==
Jílové u Prahy is located on the railway line Prague–Čerčany. The D3 motorway is planned to pass near the town.

== Sights ==
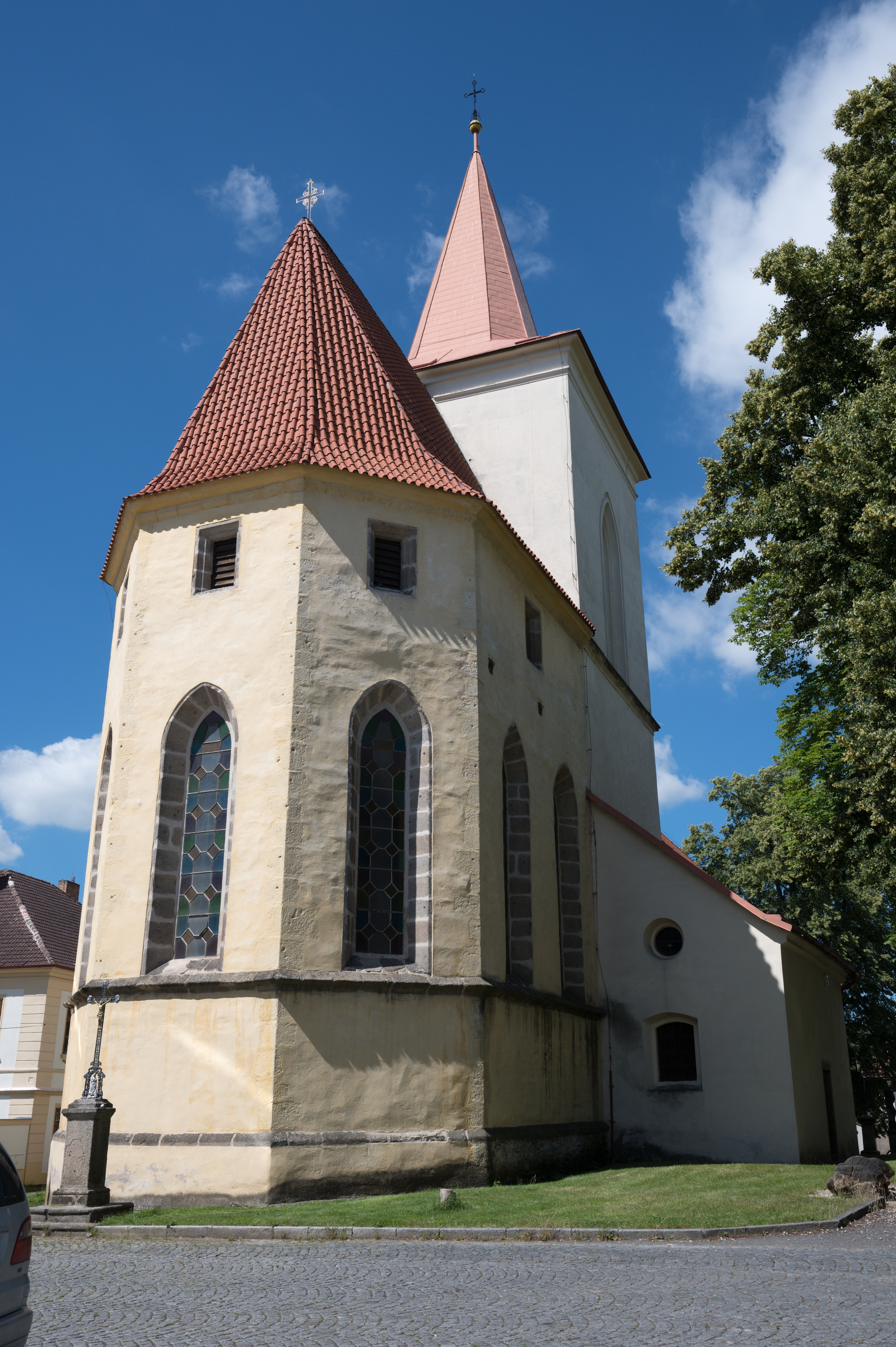
Church of Saint Adalbert

The main landmark of the historic centre is the town hall. It is a former fortress with a tower from the 14th century. It was donated to Jílové as a ruin and after it was reconstructed, the town hall was moved to the building in 1708. In 1724 the upper floor was built. In 1854 the municipality have added a side building to the tower, and in 1855 a prison.

The Church of Saint Adalbert is the oldest building in the town. It was built on the site of a wooden church in the first half of the 13th century and originally dedicated to St. Nicholas. In 1567, it was damaged by a fire, and during the 17th and 18th centuries, the church was repaired and baroqued several times.

Žampach viaduct is a railway arch bridge, the highest stone bridge in the country.

== In popular culture ==
Several shots of the 1984 Oscars-awarded film Amadeus were shot in the local church.

== Notable people ==
- Edward Kelley (1555–1597), English alchemist and occultist; lived here
- František Chvalkovský (1885–1945), politician and diplomat

== Twin towns – sister cities ==
Jílové u Prahy is twinned with:

- Holzgerlingen, Germany
- Nováky, Slovakia
- Peschici, Italy
