= Čtyřkoly =

- Municipality
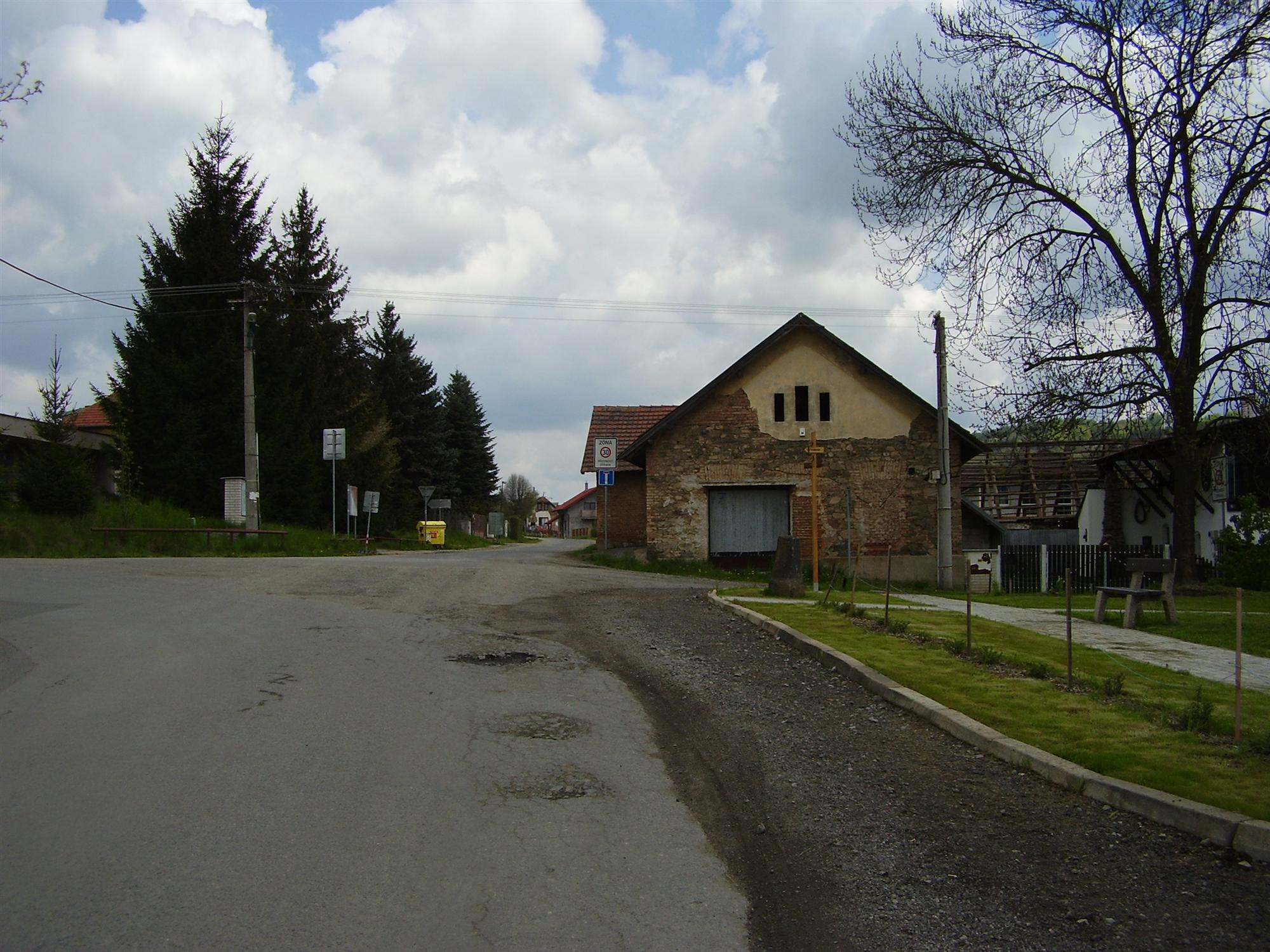
- Centre of Čtyřkoly

- Location in the Czech Republic
- Coordinates: 49°52′7″N 14°43′11″E
- Country: Czech Republic
- Region: Central Bohemian
- District: Benešov
- First mentioned: 1549

Area
  - Total: 2.88 km^{2} (1.11 sq mi)
- Elevation: 280 m (920 ft)

Population (2026-01-01)
  - Total: 823
  - Density: 286/km^{2} (740/sq mi)
- Time zone: UTC+1 (CET)
  - Summer (DST): UTC+2 (CEST)
- Postal code: 257 22
- Website: www.ctyrkoly.cz

Čtyřkoly is a municipality and village in Benešov District in the Central Bohemian Region of the Czech Republic. It has about 800 inhabitants.

== Administrative division ==
Čtyřkoly consists of two municipal parts (in brackets population according to the 2021 census):

- Čtyřkoly (586)
- Javorník (259)

== Etymology ==
The name is derived from the word combination čtyři kola, meaning 'four wheels'. In the place where the village was founded, there was originally a mill with four wheels.

== Geography ==
Čtyřkoly is located about 9 kilometres (6 mi) north of Benešov and 24 km (15 mi) southeast of Prague. It lies in the Benešov Uplands. The highest point is a hill at 364 m (1,194 ft) above sea level. The municipality is situated on the right bank of the Sázava River. The stream Zaječický potok flows through the municipality into the Sázava.

== History ==
The first written mention of Čtyřkoly is from 1549. The railway was built in 1871.

== Demographics ==
Historical population

Year	Pop.	±%
1869	467	—
1880	334	−28.5%
1890	293	−12.3%
1900	296	+1.0%
1910	332	+12.2%

Year	Pop.	±%
1921	347	+4.5%
1930	354	+2.0%
1950	398	+12.4%
1961	375	−5.8%
1970	331	−11.7%

Year	Pop.	±%
1980	279	−15.7%
1991	215	−22.9%
2001	275	+27.9%
2011	634	+130.5%
2021	845	+33.3%

Source: Censuses

== Transport ==
The I/3 road (part of the European route E55), which connects the D1 motorway with Tábor and further continues as the D3 motorway, passes through the municipality.

Čtyřkoly is located on the railway line Prague–Benešov.

== Sights ==
The only protected cultural monument in the municipality is the locality where the Čtyřkoly Castle stood. The castle was built in the 13th or 14th century. Only landscaping and the floor plan survived from the ruin.
