= Nespeky =

- Municipality
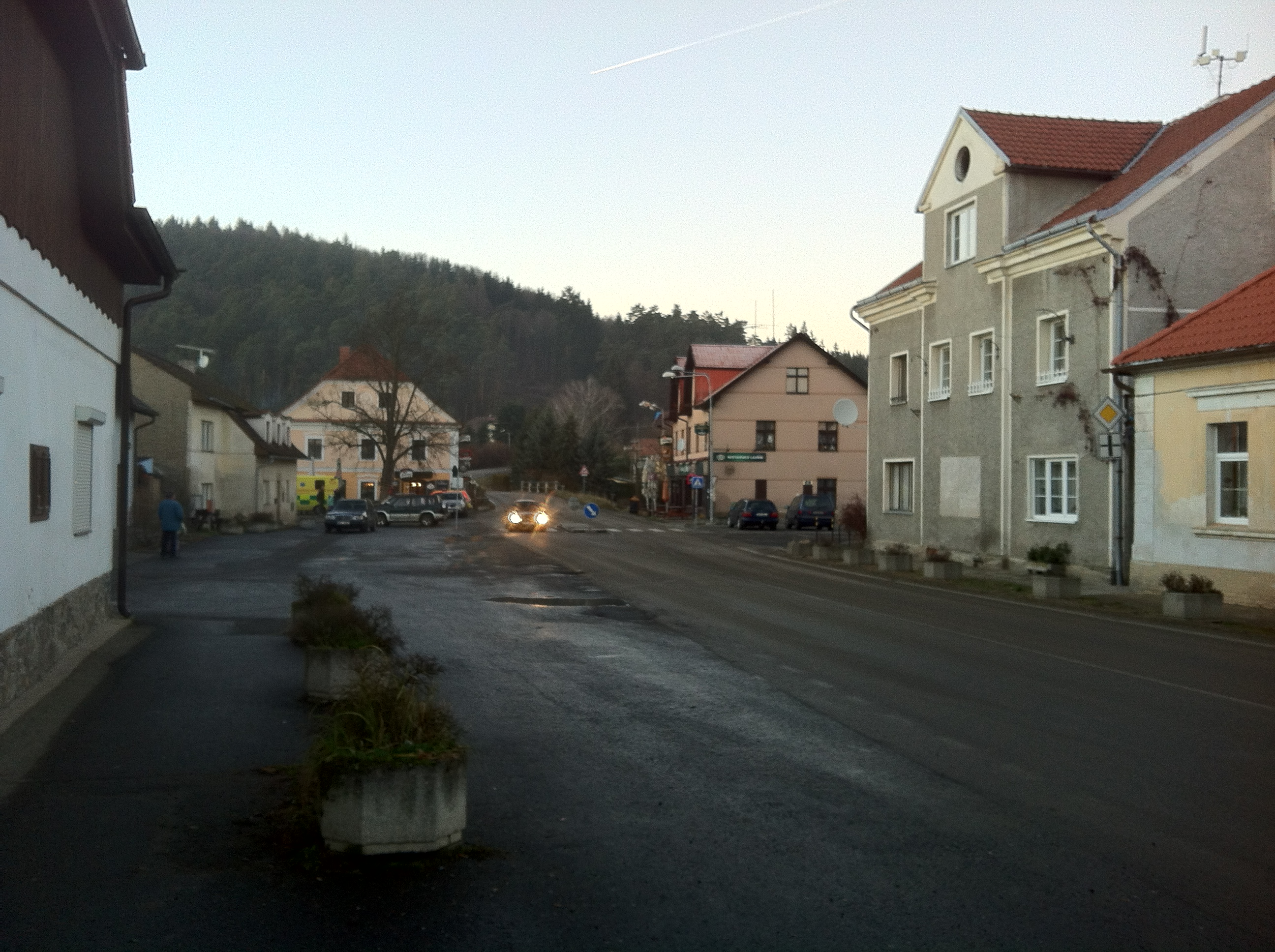
- Centre of Nespeky

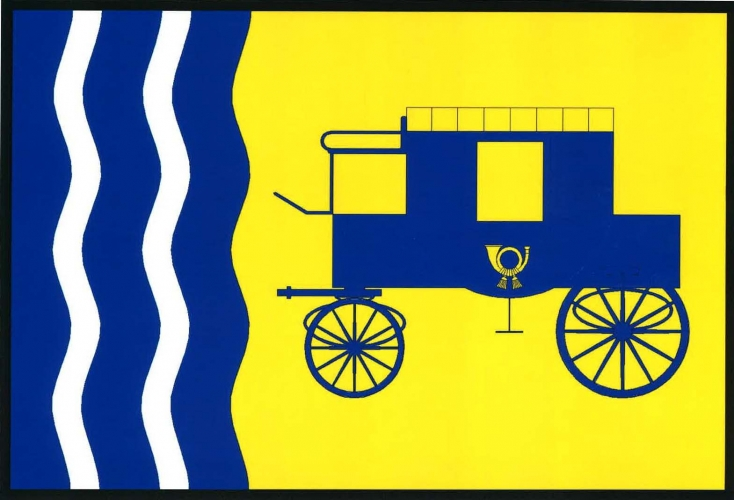
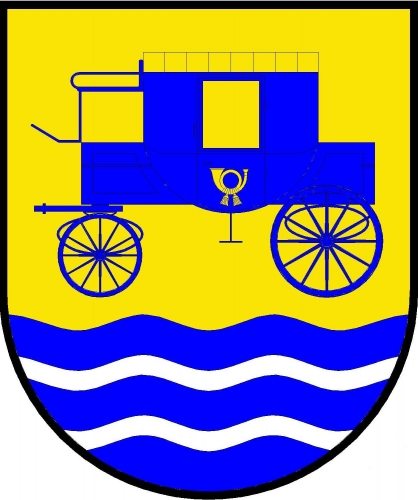
- Flag Coat of arms

- Location in the Czech Republic
- Coordinates: 49°51′34″N 14°39′34″E
- Country: Czech Republic
- Region: Central Bohemian
- District: Benešov
- First mentioned: 1350

Area
  - Total: 4.96 km^{2} (1.92 sq mi)
- Elevation: 267 m (876 ft)

Population (2026-01-01)
  - Total: 811
  - Density: 164/km^{2} (423/sq mi)
- Time zone: UTC+1 (CET)
  - Summer (DST): UTC+2 (CEST)
- Postal code: 257 22
- Website: www.nespeky.com

Nespeky is a municipality and village in Benešov District in the Central Bohemian Region of the Czech Republic. It has about 800 inhabitants.

== Administrative division ==
Nespeky consists of three municipal parts (in brackets population according to the 2021 census):

- Nespeky (543)
- Ledce (22)
- Městečko (248)

== Etymology ==
The initial name of the settlement was Nezpěky. The old Czech word nezpěk denoted a person who does not resist, a person who does not rebel. So Nezpěky was a village of such people.

== Geography ==
Nespeky is located about 8 kilometres (5 mi) north of Benešov and 23 km (14 mi) southeast of Prague. It lies in the Benešov Uplands. The highest point is at 404 m (1,325 ft) above sea level. The municipality is situated on the right bank of the Sázava River.

== History ==
The first written mention of Nespeky is 1350. The village was founded by a road from Prague to Tábor and Linz. In the 15th century, the village was divided into two parts with different owners: one part belonged to the Konopiště estate and the other part belonged to the Pyšely estate. The two parts remained divided until the establishment of an independent municipality in 1850.

Ledce was first mentioned in 1360 and Městečko was first mentioned in 1495. The village of Ledce was almost completely destroyed in the 15th century during the siege of the Kostelec Castle (today known as Zbořený Kostelec).

== Demographics ==
Historical population

Year	Pop.	±%
1869	420	—
1880	399	−5.0%
1890	376	−5.8%
1900	399	+6.1%
1910	382	−4.3%

Year	Pop.	±%
1921	367	−3.9%
1930	469	+27.8%
1950	572	+22.0%
1961	592	+3.5%
1970	520	−12.2%

Year	Pop.	±%
1980	469	−9.8%
1991	389	−17.1%
2001	447	+14.9%
2011	669	+49.7%
2021	813	+21.5%

Source: Censuses

== Transport ==
The I/3 road, which is part of the European route E55, runs through Městečko.

== Sights ==
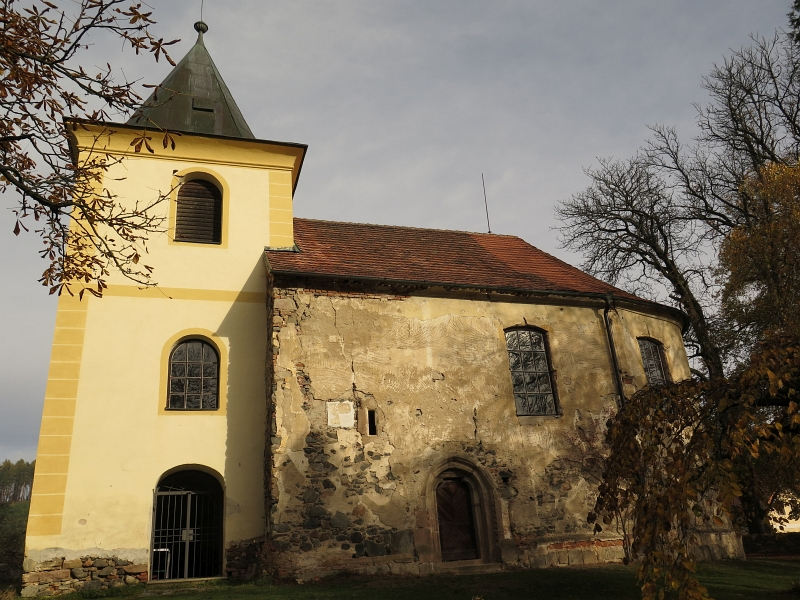
Church of Saint Bartholomew

The main landmark of the municipality is the Church of Saint Bartholomew, located near Ledce. It was probably built in the first third of the 16th century on the site of a church from the 14th century. Together with the neighbouring farm building, they are the only remains of the original medieval settlement that has disappeared.

In Městečko is a small stone belfry from the 19th century, also protected as a cultural monument.

== Notable people ==
- Antonín Panenka (born 1948), footballer; lives here
