= Hamry nad Sázavou =

- Municipality
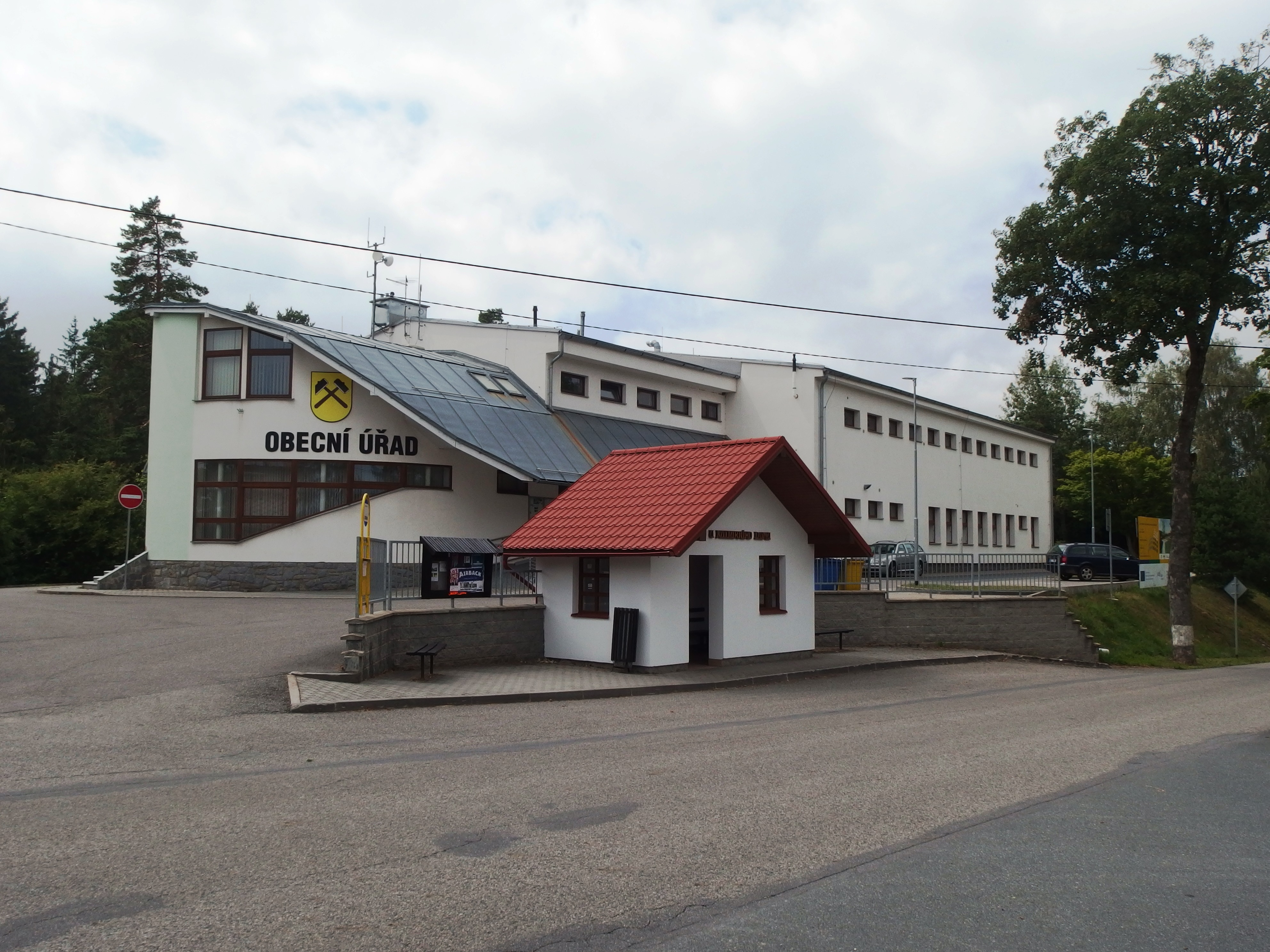
- Municipal office and bus stop

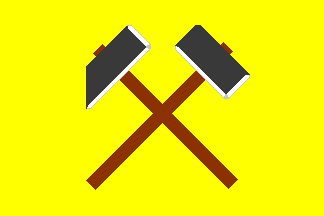
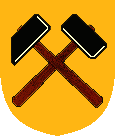
- Flag Coat of arms

- Location in the Czech Republic
- Coordinates: 49°33′58″N 15°54′6″E
- Country: Czech Republic
- Region: Vysočina
- District: Žďár nad Sázavou
- First mentioned: 1470

Area
  - Total: 7.12 km^{2} (2.75 sq mi)
- Elevation: 554 m (1,818 ft)

Population (2026-01-01)
  - Total: 1,568
  - Density: 220/km^{2} (570/sq mi)
- Time zone: UTC+1 (CET)
  - Summer (DST): UTC+2 (CEST)
- Postal code: 591 01
- Website: www.hamryns.cz

Hamry nad Sázavou is a municipality and village in Žďár nad Sázavou District in the Vysočina Region of the Czech Republic. It has about 1,600 inhabitants.

== Administrative division ==
Hamry nad Sázavou consists of three municipal parts (in brackets population according to the 2021 census):

- Hamry nad Sázavou (1,163)
- Najdek (249)
- Šlakhamry (106)

== Etymology ==
The name literally means 'hammer mills upon the Sázava' in Czech.

== Geography ==
Hamry nad Sázavou is located about 1 kilometre (1 mi) west of Žďár nad Sázavou and 28 km (17 mi) northeast of Jihlava. It lies in the Křižanov Highlands. The highest point is at 622 m (2,041 ft) above sea level. The Sázava River flows through the municipality. The municipal territory is rich in fishponds. The entire municipality lies within the Žďárské vrchy Protected Landscape Area.

== History ==
Around 1300, iron ore began to be mined in the area. Between 1357 and 1409, the first hammer mill was established on the territory of today's municipality. In the middle of the 15th century, four hammer mills were documented here. At the turn of the 17th and 18th centuries, the importance of the hammer mills declined and they were abolished or converted into watermills.

== Demographics ==
Historical population

Year	Pop.	±%
1869	844	—
1880	857	+1.5%
1890	825	−3.7%
1900	778	−5.7%
1910	758	−2.6%

Year	Pop.	±%
1921	743	−2.0%
1930	738	−0.7%
1950	760	+3.0%
1961	934	+22.9%
1970	1,065	+14.0%

Year	Pop.	±%
1980	1,191	+11.8%
1991	1,200	+0.8%
2001	1,212	+1.0%
2011	1,409	+16.3%
2021	1,518	+7.7%

Source: Censuses

== Transport ==
Hamry nad Sázavou is located on the railway line Havlíčkův Brod–Žďár nad Sázavou.

== Sights ==
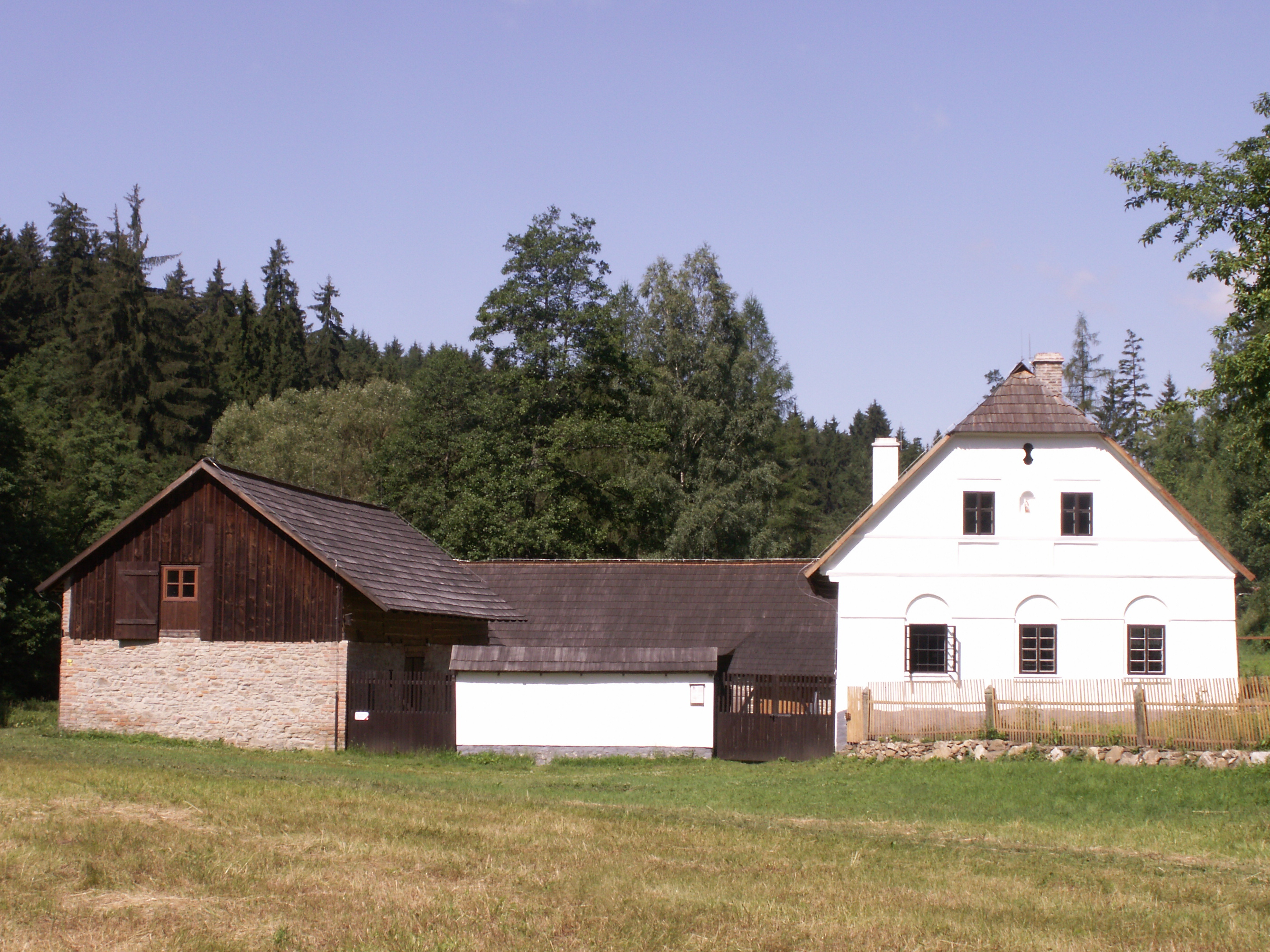
Former watermill, now a museum

The most important monument is the former water mill. Today it houses a museum exposition.
