= Žampach viaduct =

Coordinates: 49°52′23″N 14°29′17″E

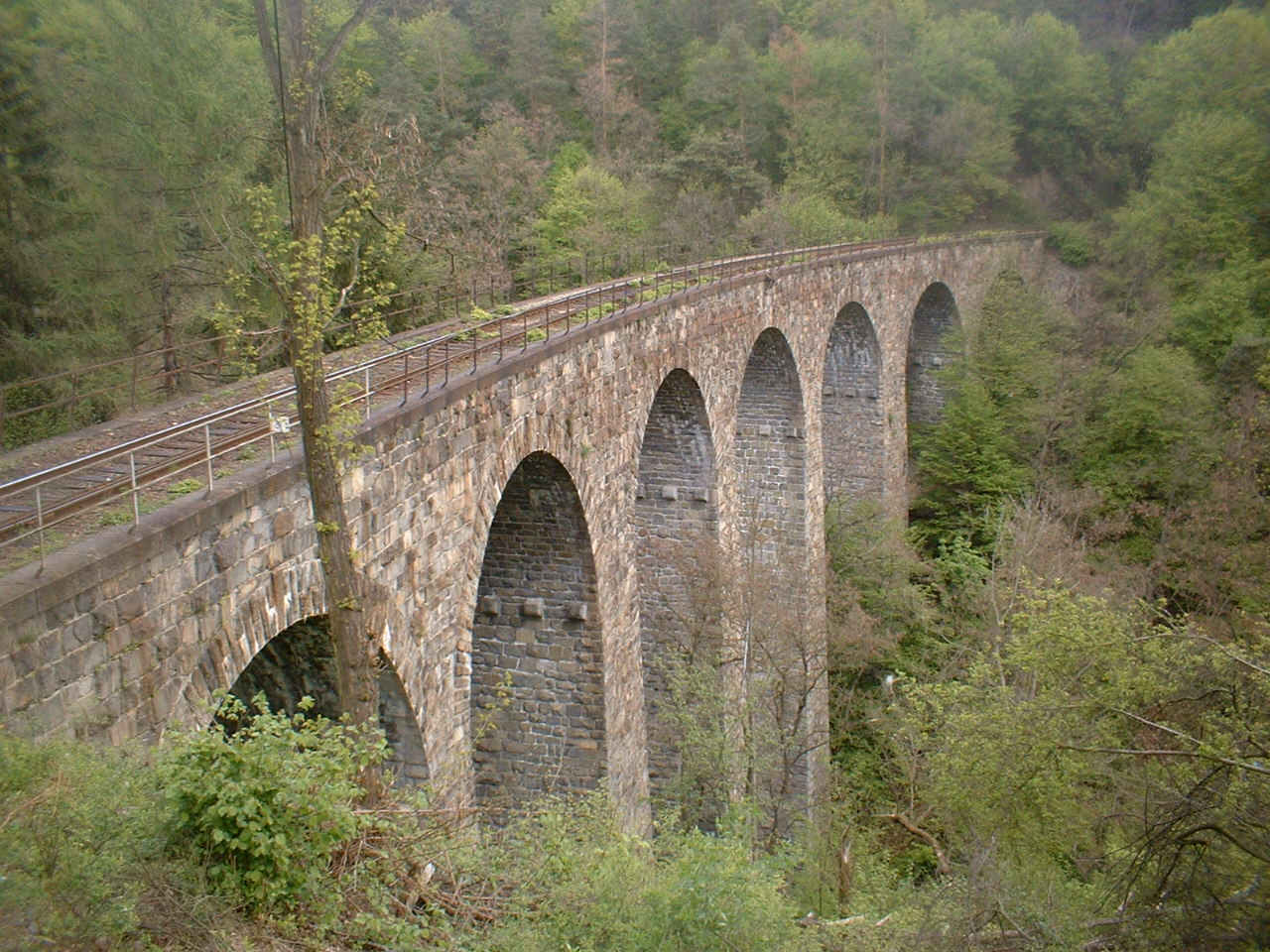
Žampach viaduct

Žampach viaduct is a railway arch bridge in the territory of Jílové u Prahy in the Czech Republic near the village of Žampach. It is the highest stone bridge in the country. It is 41.73 m high, 109.3 m long, and formed by seven arches, each 12 m wide. It was constructed from 1898 to 1900 mainly by Italian workers. It was featured on a coin minted by the Czech National Bank in 2013.

It is located on track 210 (Vrané nad Vltavou – Čerčany) between the Luka pod Medníkem and Jílové u Prahy stations.
