= Trpišovice =

- Municipality
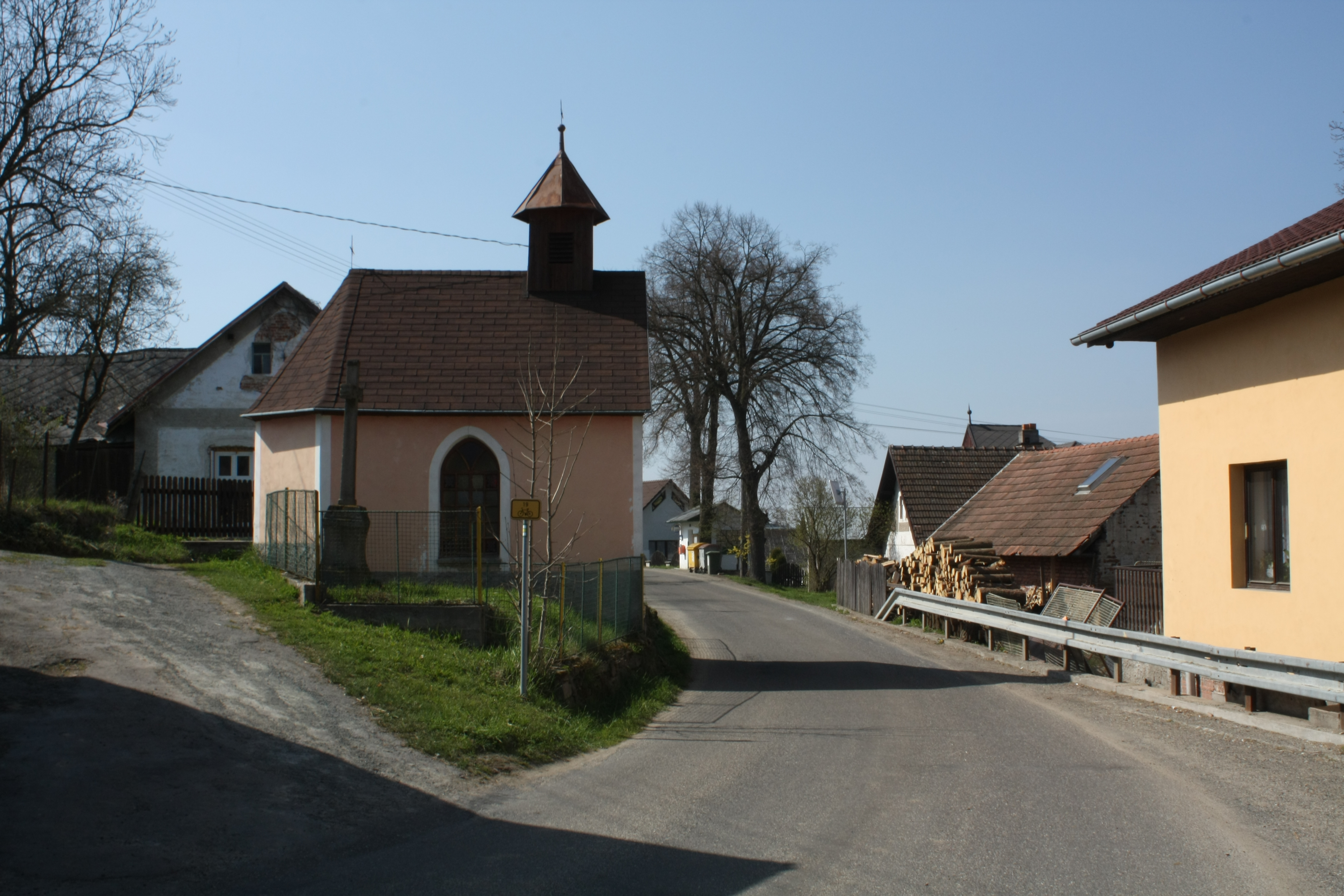
- Dobrovítova Lhota, a part of Trpišovice

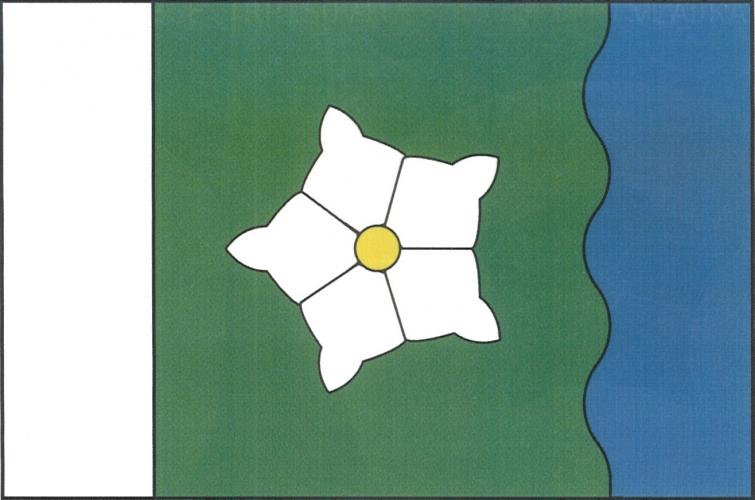
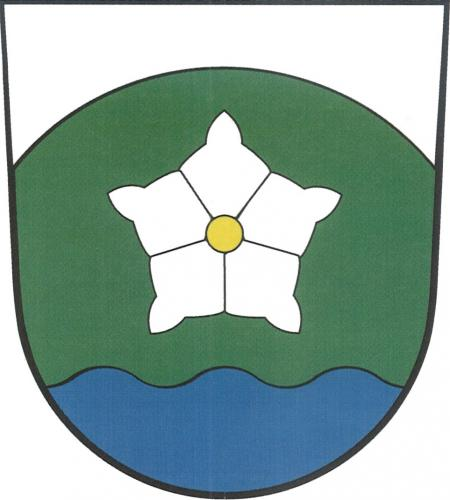
- Flag Coat of arms

- Location in the Czech Republic
- Coordinates: 49°39′19″N 15°19′56″E
- Country: Czech Republic
- Region: Vysočina
- District: Havlíčkův Brod
- First mentioned: 1453

Area
  - Total: 7.00 km^{2} (2.70 sq mi)
- Elevation: 475 m (1,558 ft)

Population (2026-01-01)
  - Total: 164
  - Density: 23.4/km^{2} (60.7/sq mi)
- Time zone: UTC+1 (CET)
  - Summer (DST): UTC+2 (CEST)
- Postal codes: 582 91, 584 01
- Website: www.trpisovice.cz

Trpišovice is a municipality and village in Havlíčkův Brod District in the Vysočina Region of the Czech Republic. It has about 200 inhabitants.

Trpišovice lies approximately 19 kilometres (12 mi) west of Havlíčkův Brod, 35 km (22 mi) north-west of Jihlava, and 81 km (50 mi) south-east of Prague.

== Administrative division ==
Trpišovice consists of six municipal parts (in brackets population according to the 2021 census):

- Trpišovice (19)
- Bilantova Lhota (26)
- Dobrovítova Lhota (52)
- Koňkovice (52)
- Remuta (7)
- Smrčná (10)

== Demographics ==
Historical population
Year	Pop.	±%
1869	467	—
1880	499	+6.9%
1890	480	−3.8%
1900	499	+4.0%
1910	476	−4.6%
1921	421	−11.6%
1930	432	+2.6%
1950	335	−22.5%
1961	344	+2.7%
1970	328	−4.7%
1980	223	−32.0%
1991	171	−23.3%
2001	158	−7.6%
2011	148	−6.3%
2021	166	+12.2%
Source: Censuses
