= Čejkovice (České Budějovice District) =

- Municipality
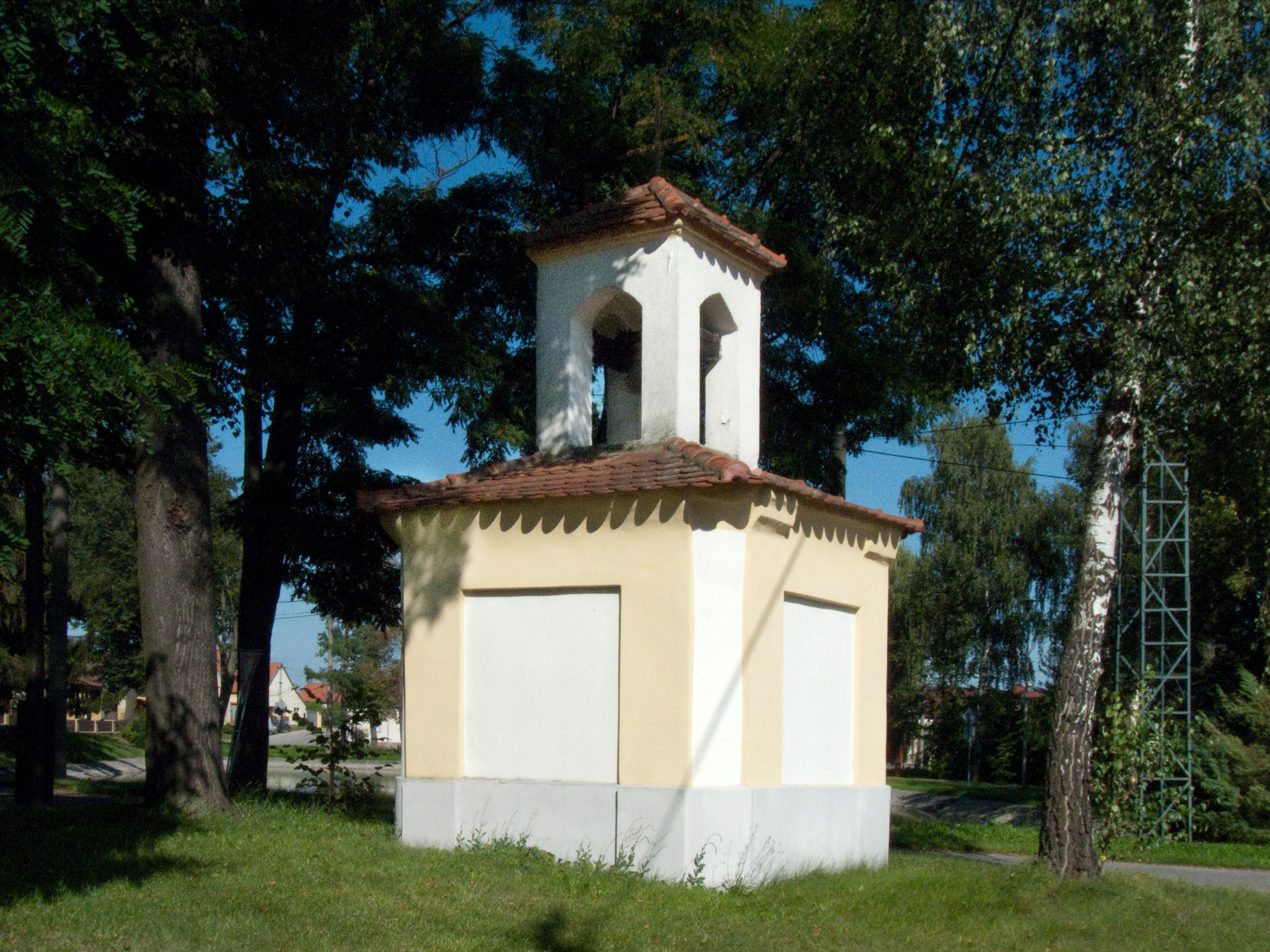
- Chapel of Saint John of Nepomuk

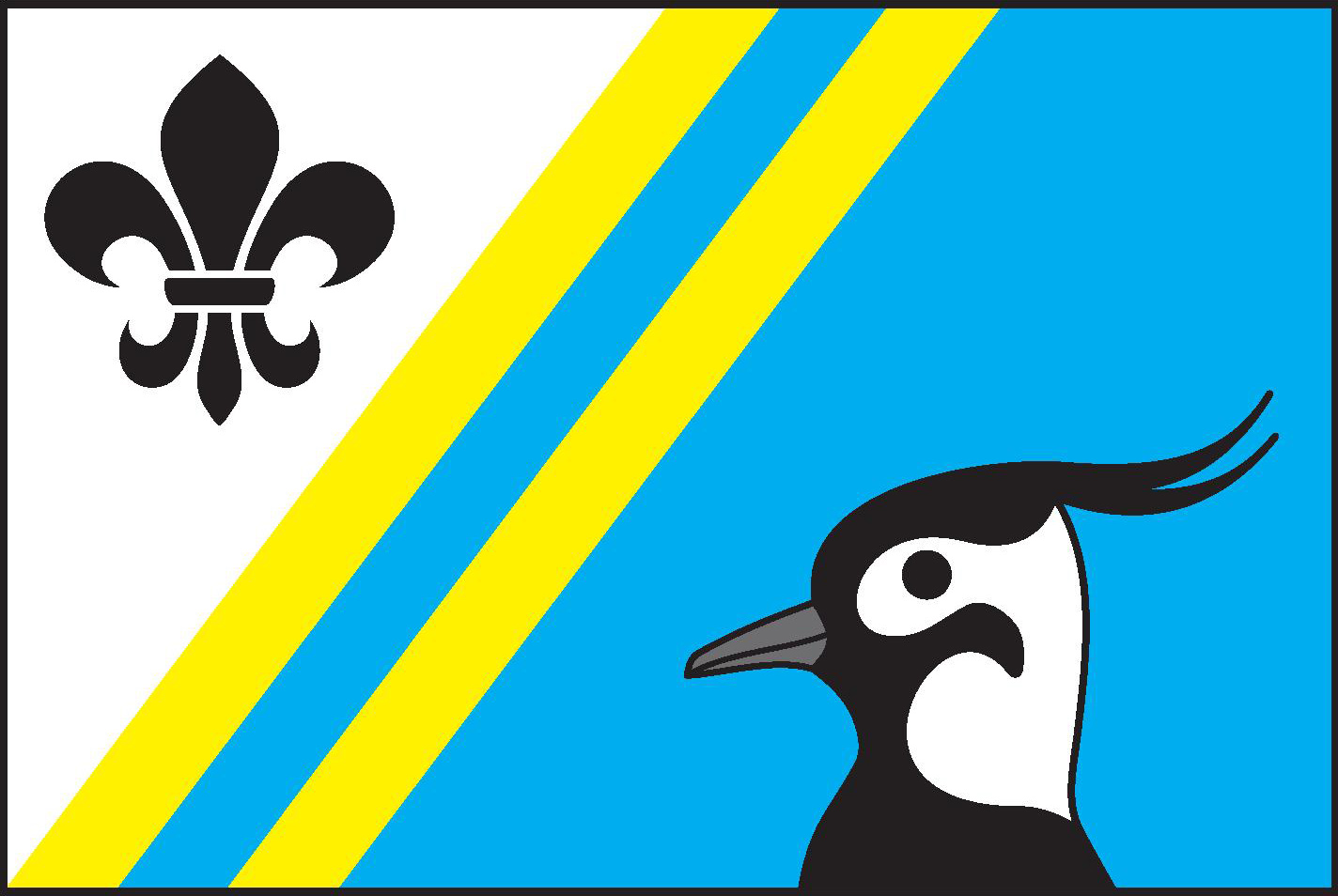
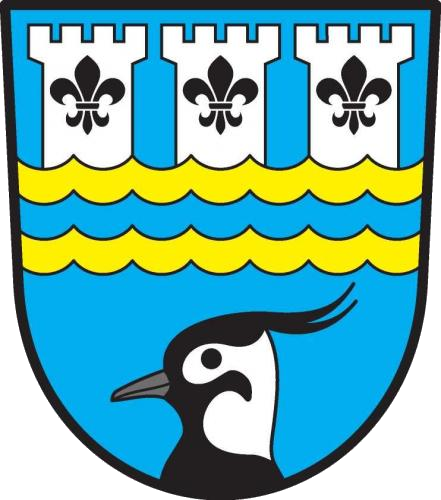
- Flag Coat of arms

- Location in the Czech Republic
- Coordinates: 49°0′52″N 14°22′59″E
- Country: Czech Republic
- Region: South Bohemian
- District: České Budějovice
- First mentioned: 1400

Area
  - Total: 9.56 km^{2} (3.69 sq mi)
- Elevation: 389 m (1,276 ft)

Population (2026-01-01)
  - Total: 397
  - Density: 41.5/km^{2} (108/sq mi)
- Time zone: UTC+1 (CET)
  - Summer (DST): UTC+2 (CEST)
- Postal code: 373 41
- Website: www.cejkovice-cb.cz

Čejkovice is a municipality and village in České Budějovice District in the South Bohemian Region of the Czech Republic. It has about 400 inhabitants.

Čejkovice lies approximately 9 kilometres (6 mi) north-west of České Budějovice and 120 km (75 mi) south of Prague.

== Demographics ==
Historical population
Year	Pop.	±%
1869	310	—
1880	370	+19.4%
1890	371	+0.3%
1900	393	+5.9%
1910	377	−4.1%
1921	380	+0.8%
1930	348	−8.4%
1950	308	−11.5%
1961	245	−20.5%
1970	221	−9.8%
1980	218	−1.4%
1991	274	+25.7%
2001	286	+4.4%
2011	339	+18.5%
2021	389	+14.7%
Source: Censuses
