= Čejkovice (Znojmo District) =

- Municipality
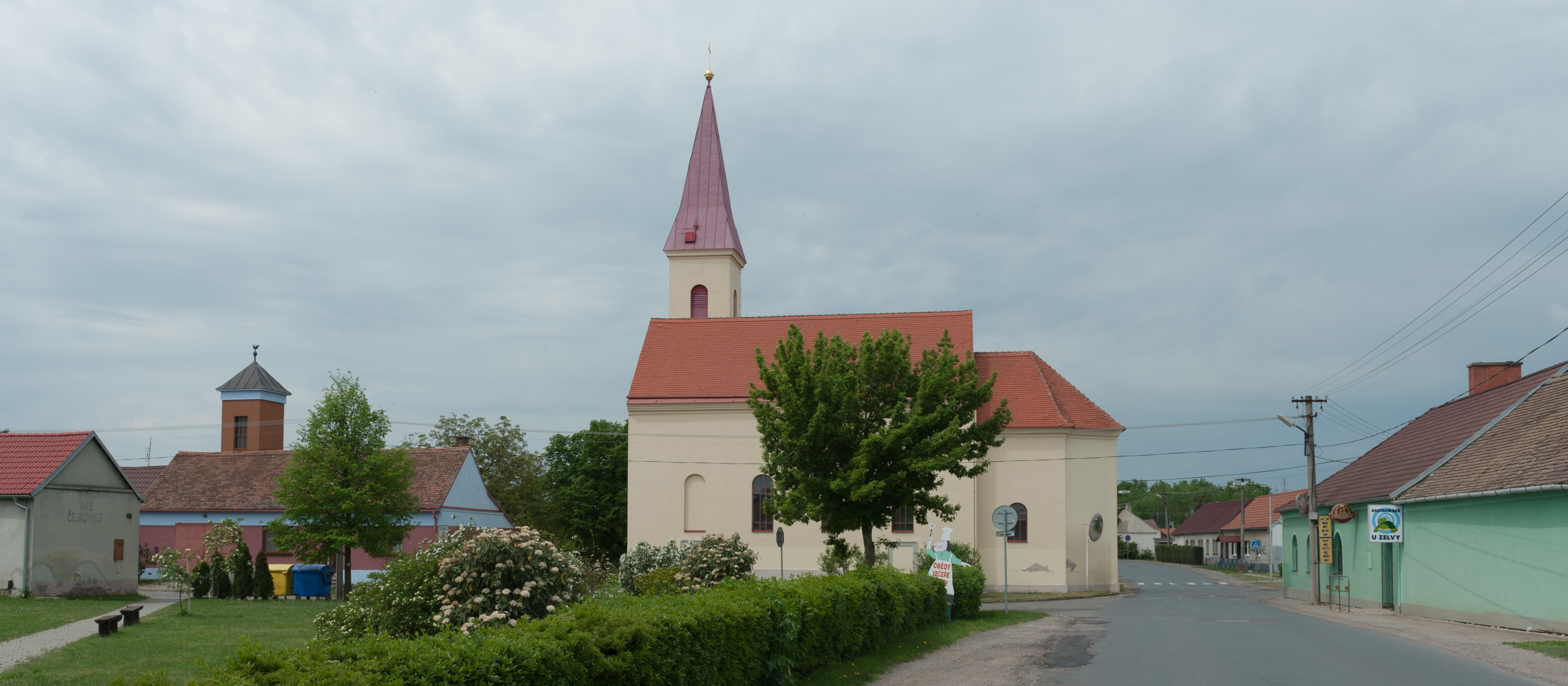
- Church of Our Lady of the Snow

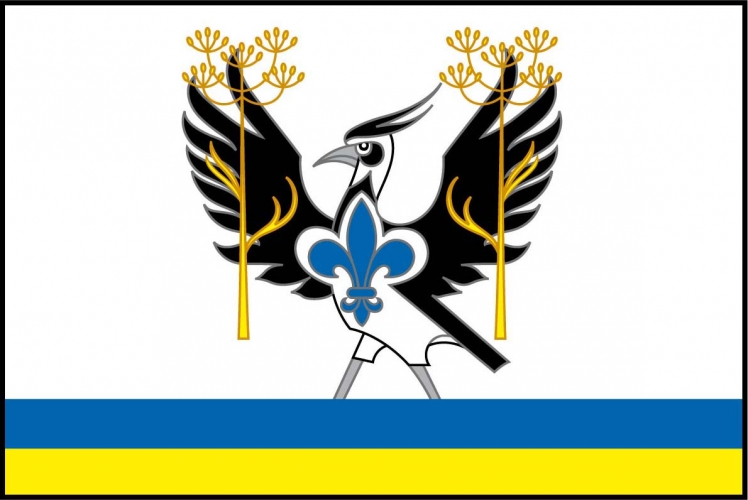
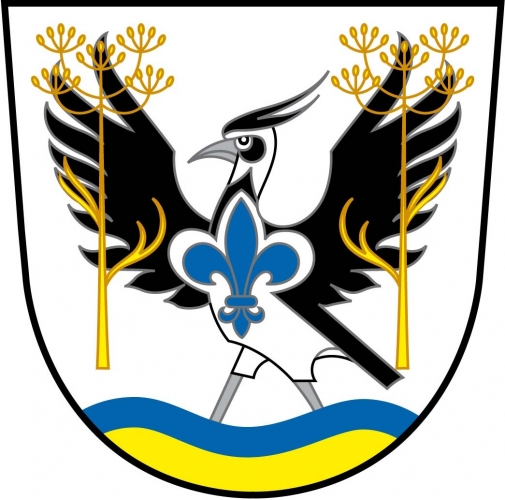
- Flag Coat of arms

- Location in the Czech Republic
- Coordinates: 48°52′40″N 16°17′14″E
- Country: Czech Republic
- Region: South Moravian
- District: Znojmo
- First mentioned: 1248

Area
  - Total: 9.20 km^{2} (3.55 sq mi)
- Elevation: 233 m (764 ft)

Population (2026-01-01)
  - Total: 252
  - Density: 27.4/km^{2} (70.9/sq mi)
- Time zone: UTC+1 (CET)
  - Summer (DST): UTC+2 (CEST)
- Postal code: 671 78
- Website: www.cejkoviceuznojma.cz

Čejkovice is a municipality and village in Znojmo District in the South Moravian Region of the Czech Republic. It has about 300 inhabitants.

Čejkovice lies approximately 19 kilometres (12 mi) east of Znojmo, 44 km (27 mi) south-west of Brno, and 191 km (119 mi) south-east of Prague.

== Demographics ==
Historical population
Year	Pop.	±%
1869	436	—
1880	474	+8.7%
1890	483	+1.9%
1900	460	−4.8%
1910	523	+13.7%
1921	538	+2.9%
1930	555	+3.2%
1950	349	−37.1%
1961	347	−0.6%
1970	317	−8.6%
1980	274	−13.6%
1991	230	−16.1%
2001	212	−7.8%
2011	203	−4.2%
2021	221	+8.9%
Source: Censuses
