= Polnička =

- Municipality
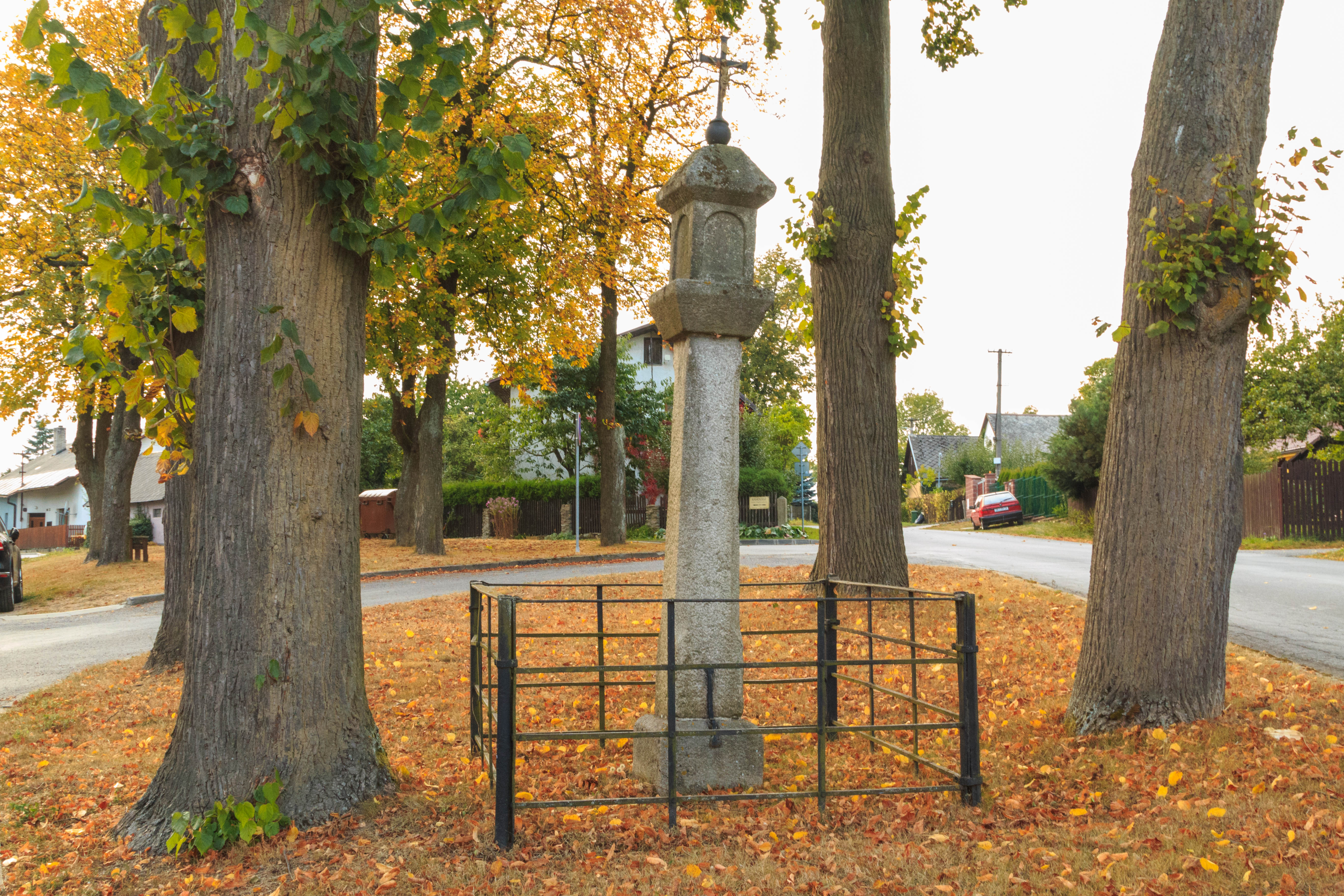
- Calvary

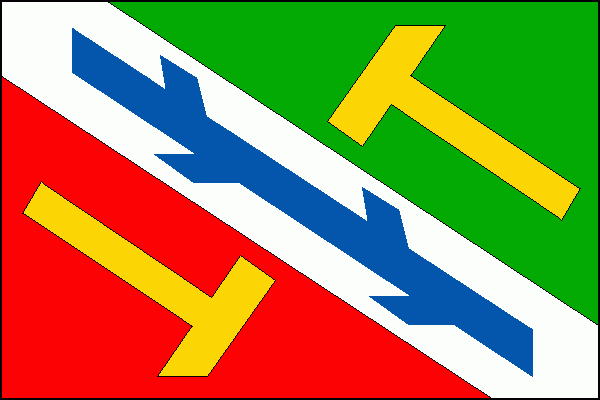
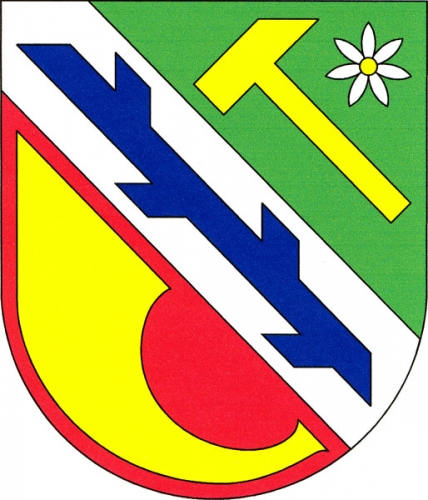
- Flag Coat of arms

- Location in the Czech Republic
- Coordinates: 49°36′27″N 15°54′59″E
- Country: Czech Republic
- Region: Vysočina
- District: Žďár nad Sázavou
- First mentioned: 1420

Area
  - Total: 19.83 km^{2} (7.66 sq mi)
- Elevation: 585 m (1,919 ft)

Population (2026-01-01)
  - Total: 804
  - Density: 40.5/km^{2} (105/sq mi)
- Time zone: UTC+1 (CET)
  - Summer (DST): UTC+2 (CEST)
- Postal code: 591 02
- Website: www.polnicka.cz

Polnička is a municipality and village in Žďár nad Sázavou District in the Vysočina Region of the Czech Republic. It has about 800 inhabitants.

Polnička lies approximately 6 kilometres (4 mi) north of Žďár nad Sázavou, 34 kilometres (21 mi) north-east of Jihlava, and 120 kilometres (75 mi) south-east of Prague.

== Demographics ==
Historical population
Year	Pop.	±%
1869	1,182	—
1880	1,094	−7.4%
1890	1,063	−2.8%
1900	965	−9.2%
1910	1,024	+6.1%
1921	925	−9.7%
1930	1,146	+23.9%
1950	719	−37.3%
1961	716	−0.4%
1970	647	−9.6%
1980	616	−4.8%
1991	601	−2.4%
2001	596	−0.8%
2011	787	+32.0%
2021	796	+1.1%
Source: Censuses
