= Mladoňovice (Chrudim District) =

- Municipality
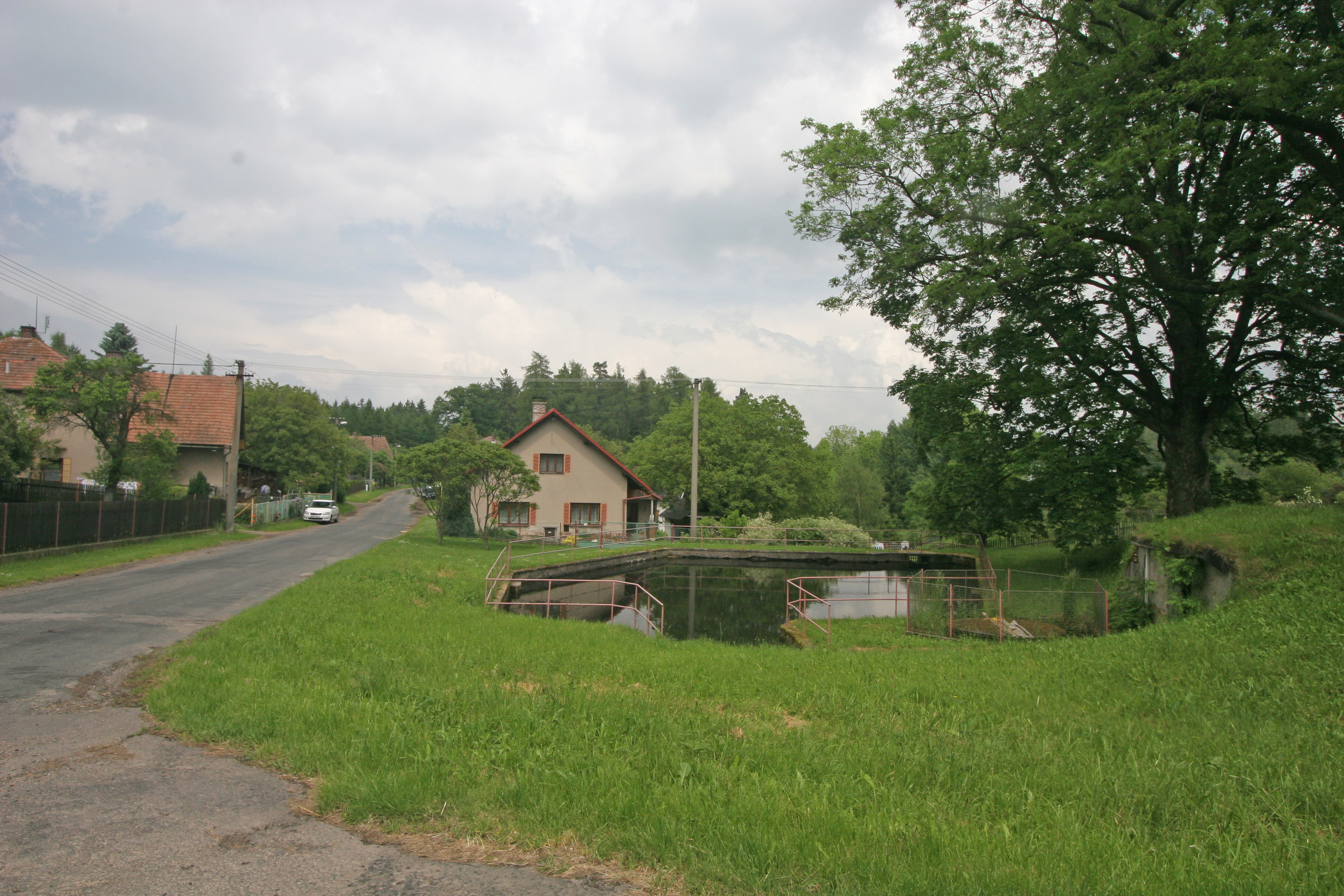
- Rtenín, a part of Mladoňovice

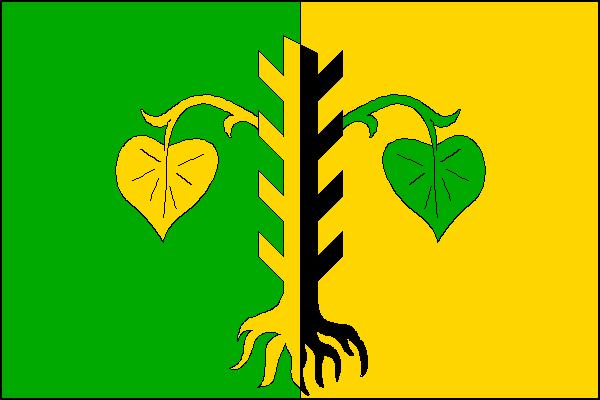
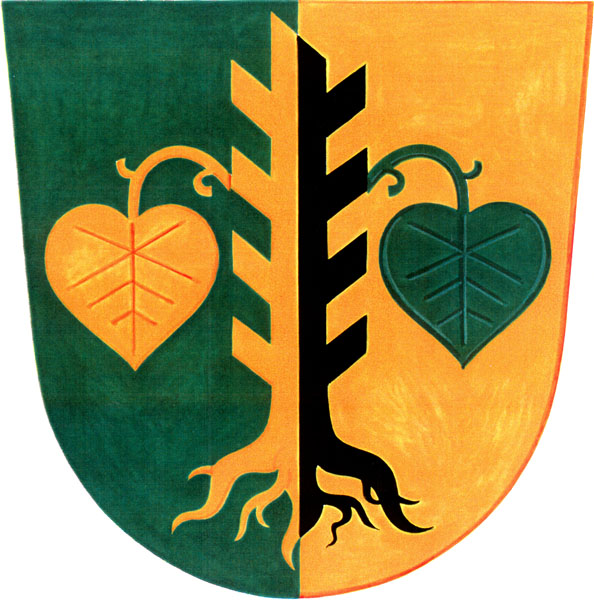
- Flag Coat of arms

- Location in the Czech Republic
- Coordinates: 49°53′14″N 15°43′25″E
- Country: Czech Republic
- Region: Pardubice
- District: Chrudim
- First mentioned: 1329

Area
  - Total: 12.40 km^{2} (4.79 sq mi)
- Elevation: 437 m (1,434 ft)

Population (2026-01-01)
  - Total: 337
  - Density: 27.2/km^{2} (70.4/sq mi)
- Time zone: UTC+1 (CET)
  - Summer (DST): UTC+2 (CEST)
- Postal code: 538 21
- Website: www.obec-mladonovice.cz

Mladoňovice is a municipality and village in Chrudim District in the Pardubice Region of the Czech Republic. It has about 300 inhabitants.

== Administrative division ==
Mladoňovice consists of eight municipal parts (in brackets population according to the 2021 census):

- Mladoňovice (53)
- Čejkovice (80)
- Deblov (33)
- Lipina (16)
- Mýtka (29)
- Petříkovice (48)
- Pohled (59)
- Rtenín (35)

== Demographics ==
Historical population
Year	Pop.	±%
1869	641	—
1880	594	−7.3%
1890	589	−0.8%
1900	602	+2.2%
1910	541	−10.1%
1921	558	+3.1%
1930	562	+0.7%
1950	421	−25.1%
1961	426	+1.2%
1970	382	−10.3%
1980	395	+3.4%
1991	387	−2.0%
2001	350	−9.6%
2011	303	−13.4%
2021	353	+16.5%
Source: Censuses
