= Kamenný Přívoz =

- Municipality
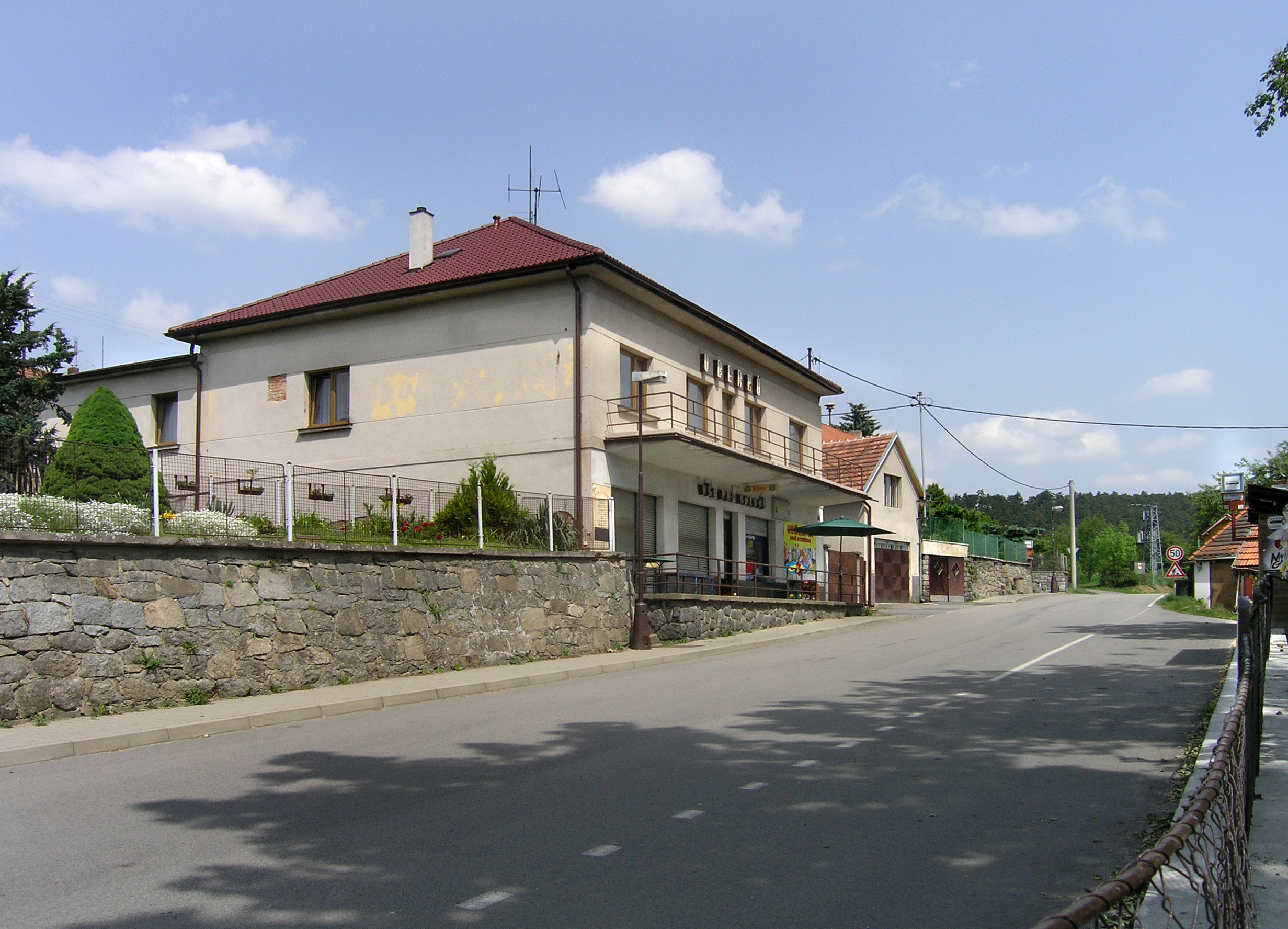
- Kamenný Újezdec, a part of Kamenný Přívoz

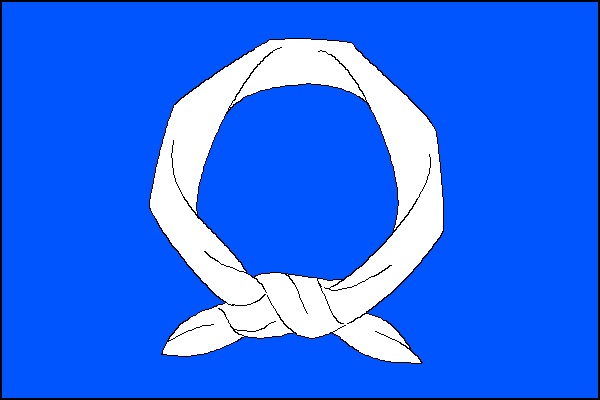
- Flag Coat of arms

- Location in the Czech Republic
- Coordinates: 49°51′47″N 14°30′12″E
- Country: Czech Republic
- Region: Central Bohemian
- District: Prague-West
- First mentioned: 1310

Area
  - Total: 6.27 km^{2} (2.42 sq mi)
- Elevation: 255 m (837 ft)

Population (2026-01-01)
  - Total: 1,612
  - Density: 257/km^{2} (666/sq mi)
- Time zone: UTC+1 (CET)
  - Summer (DST): UTC+2 (CEST)
- Postal code: 252 82
- Website: www.kamennyprivoz.cz

Kamenný Přívoz (German: Steinüberfuhr) is a municipality and village in Prague-West District in the Central Bohemian Region of the Czech Republic. It has about 1,600 inhabitants. It lies on the Sázava River.

== Administrative division ==
Kamenný Přívoz consists of four municipal parts (in brackets population according to the 2021 census):

- Kamenný Přívoz (835)
- Hostěradice (315)
- Kamenný Újezdec (393)
- Žampach (15)

== Demographics ==
Historical population
Year	Pop.	±%
1869	1,031	—
1880	1,045	+1.4%
1890	965	−7.7%
1900	1,033	+7.0%
1910	1,093	+5.8%
1921	1,060	−3.0%
1930	1,230	+16.0%
1950	1,197	−2.7%
1961	1,334	+11.4%
1970	1,281	−4.0%
1980	1,224	−4.4%
1991	1,112	−9.2%
2001	1,067	−4.0%
2011	1,305	+22.3%
2021	1,558	+19.4%
Source: Censuses
