= Pohleď =

- Municipality
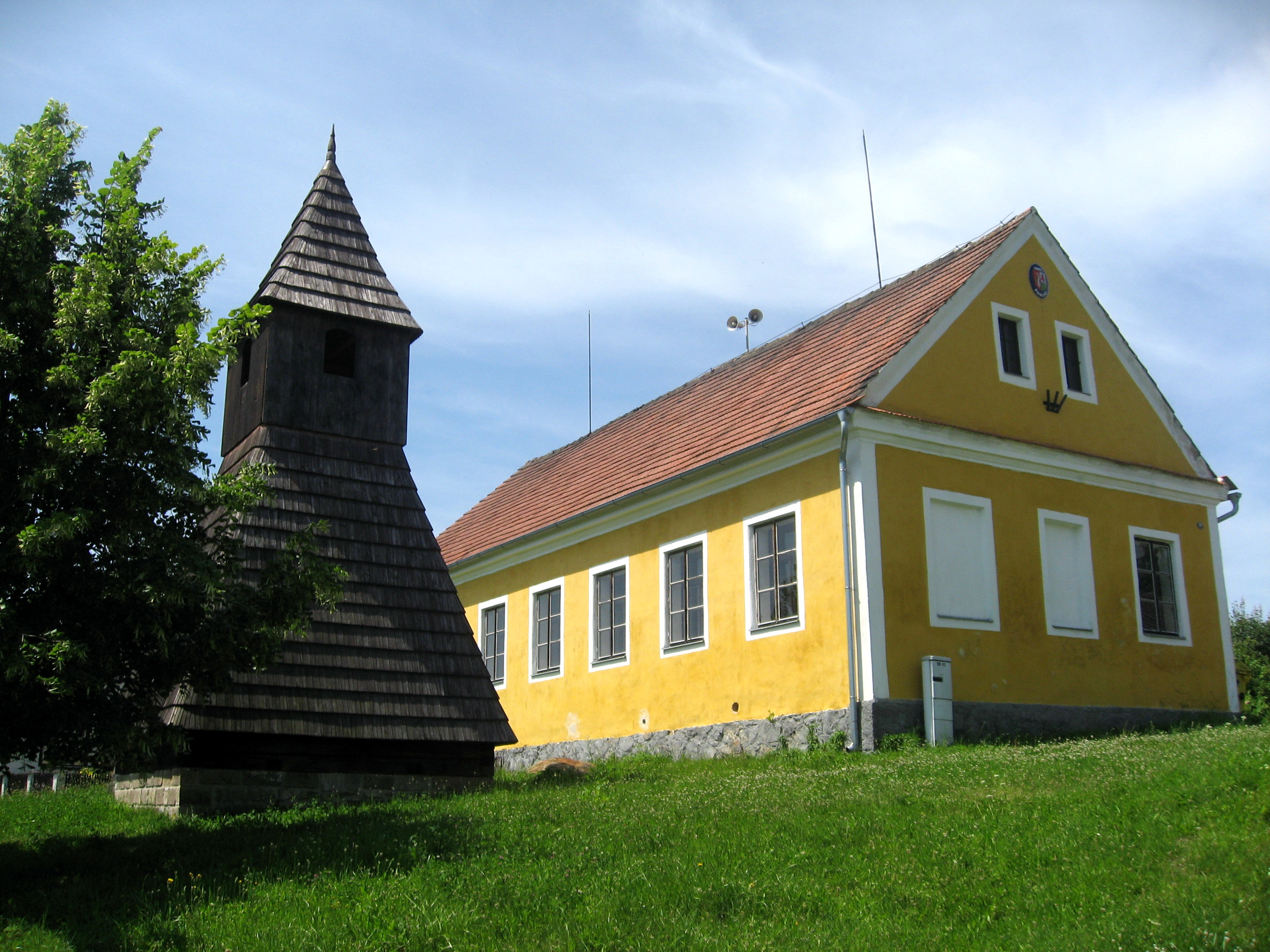
- Wooden belfry

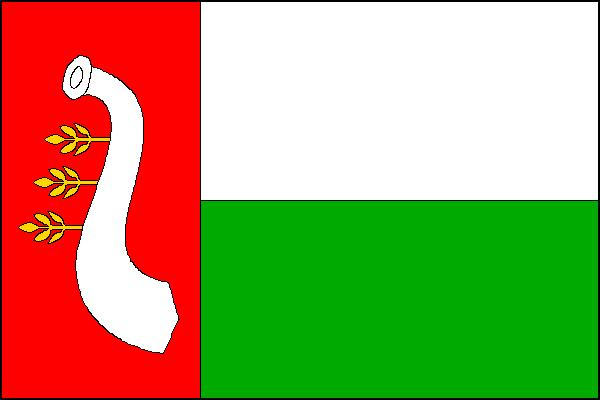
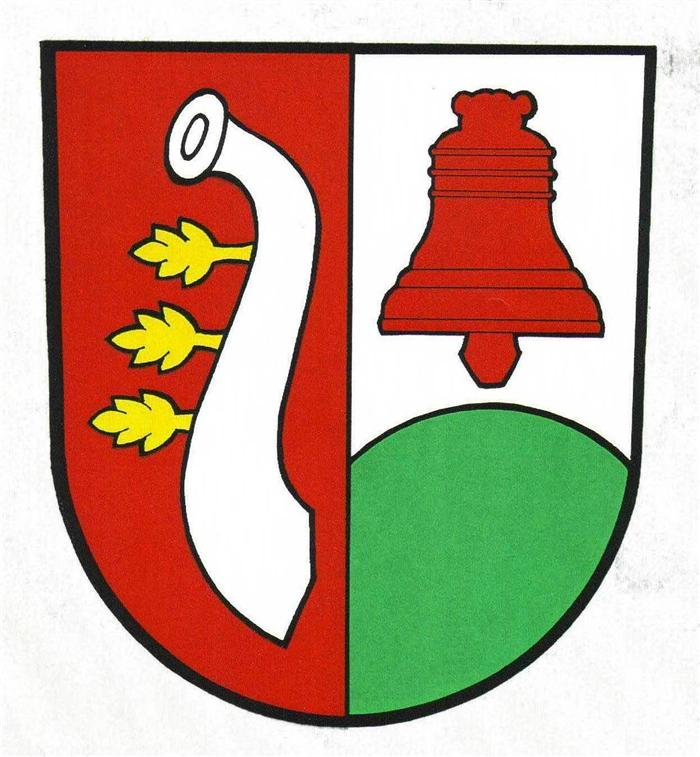
- Flag Coat of arms

- Location in the Czech Republic
- Coordinates: 49°39′32″N 15°27′8″E
- Country: Czech Republic
- Region: Vysočina
- District: Havlíčkův Brod
- First mentioned: 1400

Area
  - Total: 4.35 km^{2} (1.68 sq mi)
- Elevation: 460 m (1,510 ft)

Population (2026-01-01)
  - Total: 72
  - Density: 17/km^{2} (43/sq mi)
- Time zone: UTC+1 (CET)
  - Summer (DST): UTC+2 (CEST)
- Postal code: 582 91
- Website: www.pohled-ves.cz

Pohleď is a municipality and village in Havlíčkův Brod District in the Vysočina Region of the Czech Republic. It has about 70 inhabitants.

== Demographics ==
Historical population
Year	Pop.	±%
1869	252	—
1880	262	+4.0%
1890	238	−9.2%
1900	218	−8.4%
1910	223	+2.3%
1921	220	−1.3%
1930	200	−9.1%
1950	196	−2.0%
1961	177	−9.7%
1970	166	−6.2%
1980	123	−25.9%
1991	98	−20.3%
2001	70	−28.6%
2011	79	+12.9%
2021	75	−5.1%
Source: Censuses
