= Pohled (Havlíčkův Brod District) =

- Municipality
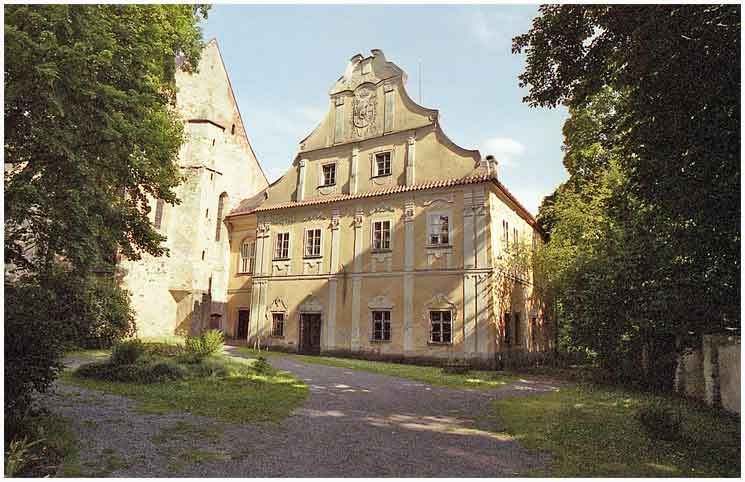
- Pohled Castle

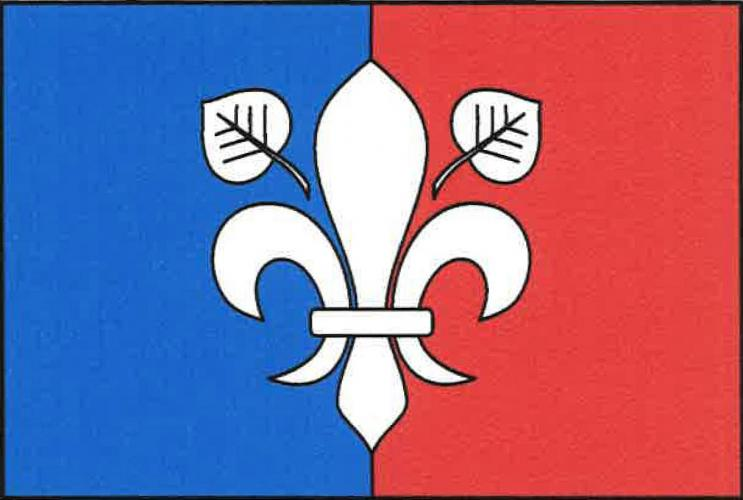
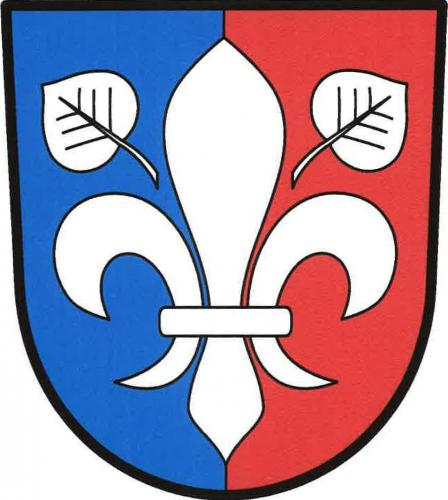
- Flag Coat of arms

- Location in the Czech Republic
- Coordinates: 49°36′13″N 15°38′53″E
- Country: Czech Republic
- Region: Vysočina
- District: Havlíčkův Brod
- First mentioned: 1265

Area
  - Total: 10.68 km^{2} (4.12 sq mi)
- Elevation: 437 m (1,434 ft)

Population (2026-01-01)
  - Total: 716
  - Density: 67.0/km^{2} (174/sq mi)
- Time zone: UTC+1 (CET)
  - Summer (DST): UTC+2 (CEST)
- Postal codes: 582 21, 582 22
- Website: www.obecpohled.cz

Pohled is a municipality and village in Havlíčkův Brod District in the Vysočina Region of the Czech Republic. It has about 700 inhabitants.

Pohled lies approximately 6 kilometres (4 mi) east of Havlíčkův Brod, 24 km (15 mi) north of Jihlava, and 103 km (64 mi) south-east of Prague.

== Administrative division ==
Pohled consists of two municipal parts (in brackets population according to the 2021 census):

- Pohled (636)
- Simtany (60)

== Demographics ==
Historical population
| Year | Pop. | ±% |
|---|---|---|
| 1869 | 774 | — |
| 1880 | 823 | +6.3% |
| 1890 | 821 | −0.2% |
| 1900 | 801 | −2.4% |
| 1910 | 825 | +3.0% |
| 1921 | 806 | −2.3% |
| 1930 | 788 | −2.2% |
| 1950 | 858 | +8.9% |
| 1961 | 884 | +3.0% |
| 1970 | 842 | −4.8% |
| 1980 | 871 | +3.4% |
| 1991 | 783 | −10.1% |
| 2001 | 721 | −7.9% |
| 2011 | 743 | +3.1% |
| 2021 | 696 | −6.3% |
Source: Censuses

== Gallery ==
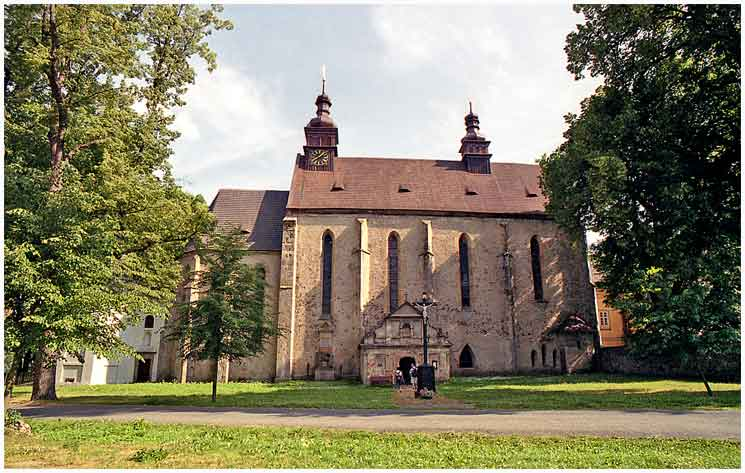
Monasterial Church of Saint Andrew

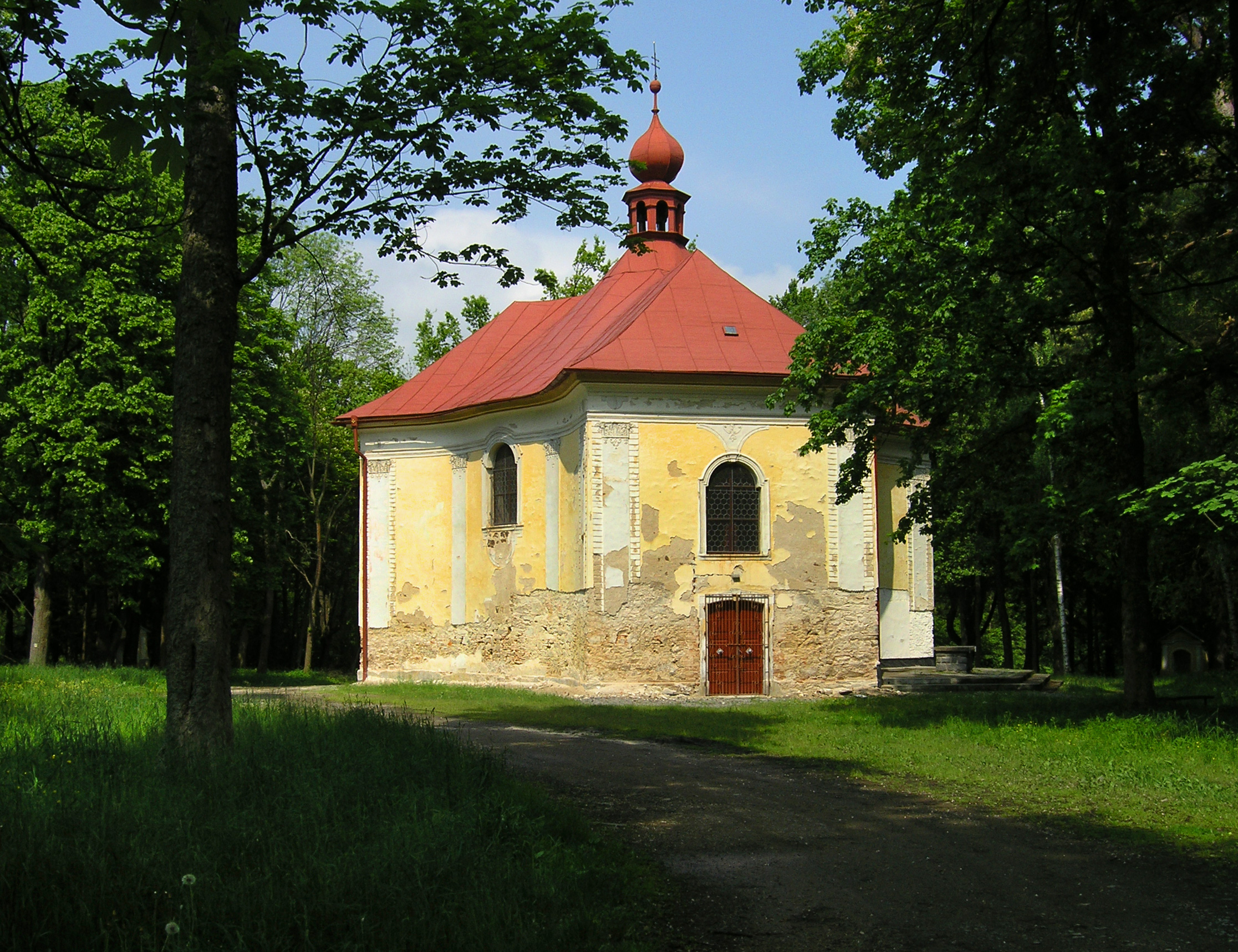
Pilgrimage Church of Saint Anne
