= List of castles in the Vysočina Region =

This is a list of castles and chateaux located in the Vysočina Region of the Czech Republic.

== A ==
- Aleje Chateau
- Aueršperk Castle

== B ==
- Bačkov Chateau
- Batelov Chateau
- Bobrová Castle
- Brtnice Chateau
- Březina Chateau
- Budeč Castle
- Budišov Chateau
- Bukov Castle

== C ==
- Chotěboř Chateau
- Chřenovice Castle
- Čalonice Castle
- Černá Chateau
- Černovice Chateau
- Červená Řečice Chateau
- Čížkov Chateau

== D ==
- Dalečín Castle
- Dalečín Chateau
- Dolní Heřmanice Castle
- Dolní Krupá Chateau
- Dolní Rožínka Chateau
- Dub Castle
- Dukovany Chateau

== G ==
- Golčův Jeníkov - nový zámek Chateau
- Golčův Jeníkov - starý zámek Chateau

== H ==
- Holoubek Castle
- Horní Cerekev Chateau
- Hořepník Chateau
- Hostačov Chateau
- Hrádek u Podmok Castle

== J ==
- Jamné Chateau
- Janštejn Castle
- Jaroměřice nad Rokytnou Chateau
- Jemnice Chateau
- Jimramov Chateau

== K ==
- Kamenice nad Lipou Chateau
- Kámen Castle
- Klokočov Chateau
- Kněžice Chateau
- Kokštejn Castle
- Kostelec Castle
- Košetice - nový zámek Chateau
- Košetice - starý zámek Chateau
- Košíkov Castle
- Kozlov (Hradisko) - dolní sídlo Castle
- Kozlov (Hradisko) - horní sídlo Castle
- Kozlov Castle
- Krasonice Chateau
- Kraví Hora Castle
- Krumvald Castle
- Křižanov Chateau

== L ==
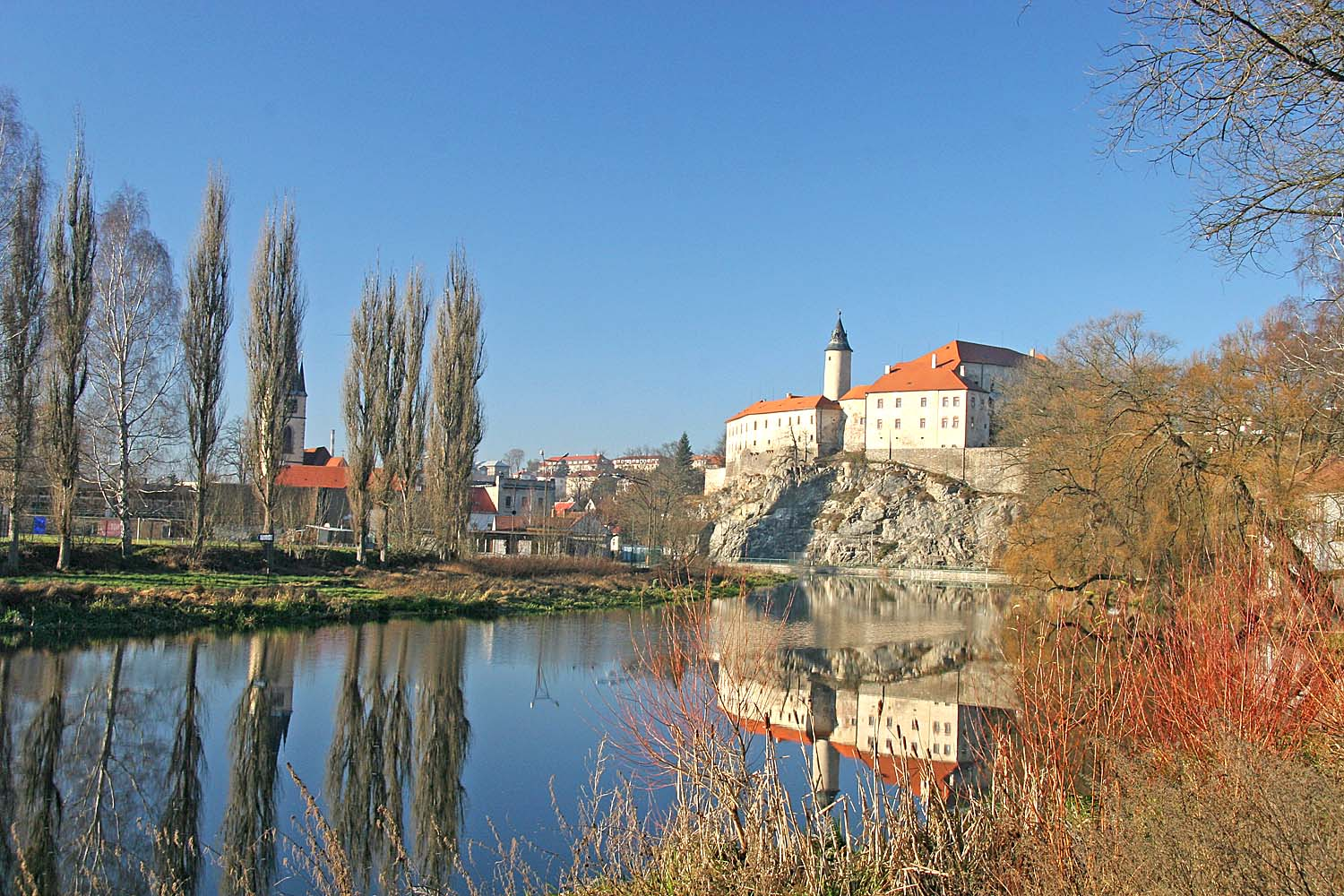
Ledeč nad Sázavou Chateau.

- Lacembok Castle
- Lamberk Castle
- Ledeč nad Sázavou Castle
- Ledeč nad Sázavou Chateau
- Lesonice Chateau
- Libice nad Doubravou Chateau
- Lipnice nad Sázavou Castle
- Litohoř Chateau
- Loučky Castle
- Luka nad Jihlavou Chateau

== M ==
- Maleč Chateau
- Mitrov Castle
- Mitrov Chateau
- Moravec Chateau
- Moravské Budějovice Chateau
- Mostiště Castle
- Mstěnice - hrad Castle

== N ==
- Náměšť nad Oslavou Chateau
- Nová Ves u Chotěboře Chateau
- Nové Město na Moravě Chateau
- Nové Syrovice Chateau
- Nový Hrad Castle
- Nový Rychnov Chateau
- Nový Studenec Chateau

== O ==
- Okříšky Chateau
- Onšov Chateau
- Orlík u Humpolce Castle
- Osová Chateau

== P ==
- Pacov Chateau
- Pechburg Castle
- Pelhřimov Chateau
- Pernštejn Castle
- Police Castle
- Polná Chateau
- Proseč - Obořiště Chateau
- Proseč u Pošné Chateau
- Přibyslav Chateau
- Pyšolec Castle

== R ==
- Rabštejn Castle
- Radešín Chateau
- Rokštejn Castle
- Ronov Castle
- Ronovec Castle
- Roštejn Castle
- Rozsochatec Chateau
- Rožná Castle
- Rudolec Chateau
- Rysov Castle

== S ==
- Sádek Castle Chateau
- Skály (u Jimramova) Castle
- Sokolov Castle
- Stránecká Zhoř Chateau
- Střeliště Castle
- Světlá nad Sázavou Chateau
- Šternberk Castle
- Štěpánov Chateau
- Štoky Chateau

== T ==
- Telč Chateau
- Třebíč Chateau
- Třešť Chateau

== U ==
- Úhrov Chateau
- Újezd u Tišnova Castle

== V ==
- Velké Meziříčí Chateau
- Větrný Jeníkov Chateau
- Vilémov Chateau
- Vilémovice Chateau
- Víckov Castle

== Z ==
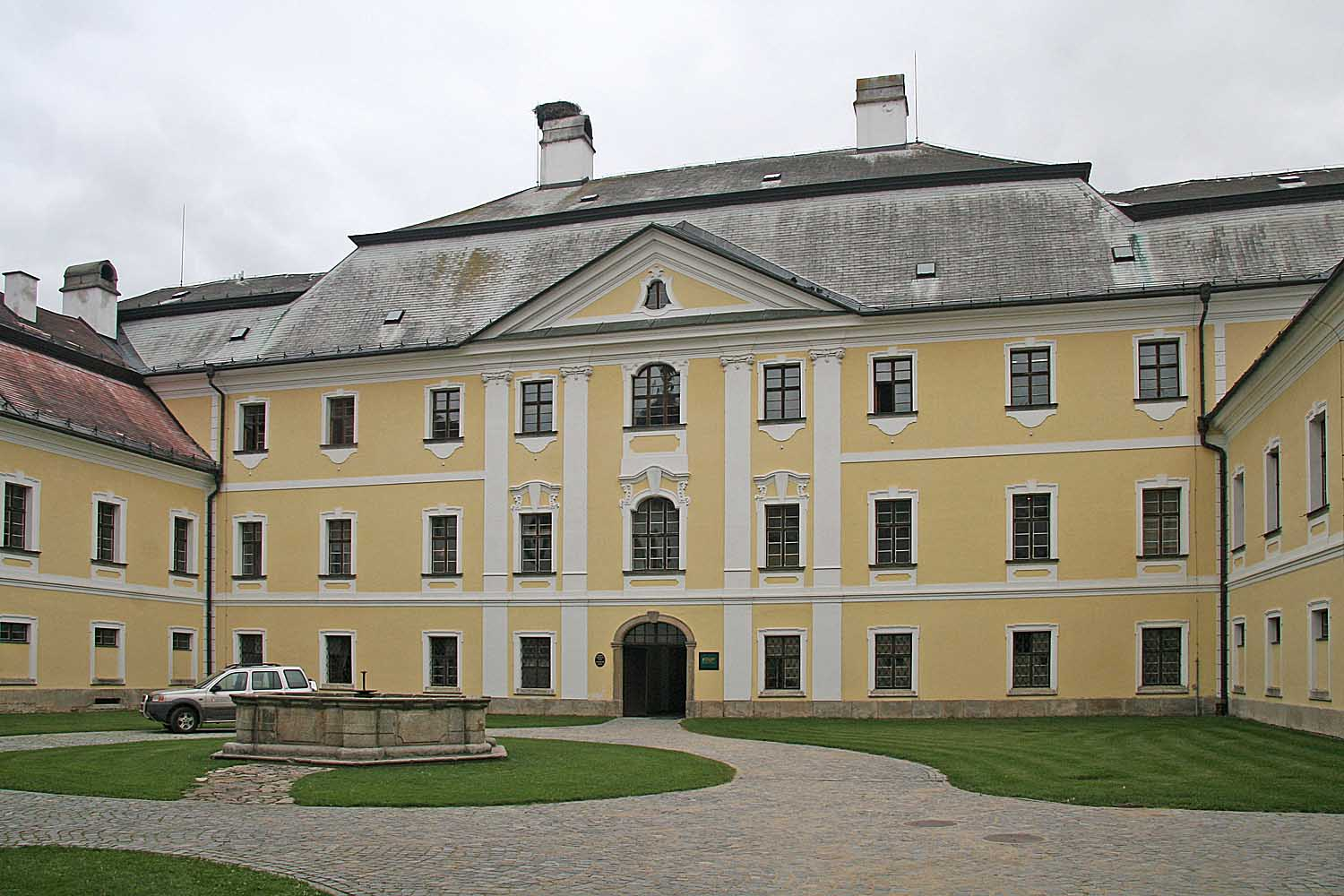
Žďár nad Sázavou Chateau.

- Zahrádka Castle (cs)
- Zboží Chateau
- Zkamenělý zámek Castle
- Zubštejn Castle
- Žďár nad Sázavou Chateau
- Žďárec Castle
- Zňátky Castle
- Žirovnice Chateau

== See also ==
- List of castles in the Czech Republic
- List of castles in Europe
- List of castles
