= Otín =

Otín may refer to places in the Czech Republic:

- Otín (Jihlava District), a municipality and village in the Vysočina Region
- Otín (Žďár nad Sázavou District), a municipality and village in the Vysočina Region
- Otín, a village and part of Jindřichův Hradec in the South Bohemian Region
- Otín, a village and part of Klatovy in the Plzeň Region
- Otín, a village and part of Luka nad Jihlavou in the Vysočina Region
- Otín, a village and part of Planá in the Plzeň Region

== See also ==
- Otin, female Islamic teacher in Central Asia
- Otin River, a river in Nigeria
