= Blatnice =

Blatnice may refer to places in the Czech Republic:

- Blatnice (Plzeň-North District), a municipality and village in the Plzeň Region
- Blatnice (Třebíč District), a municipality and village in the Vysočina Region
- Blatnice, a village and part of Maleč in the Vysočina Region
- Blatnice, a village and part of Pojbuky in the South Bohemian Region
- Blatnice pod Svatým Antonínkem, a municipality and village in the South Moravian Region
