= Klokočov =

Klokočov may refer to places:

== Czech Republic ==
- Klokočov (Havlíčkův Brod District), a municipality and village in the Vysočina Region
- Klokočov, a village and part of Vítkov in the Moravian-Silesian Region
- Klokočov, a village and part of Vlksice in the South Bohemian Region

== Slovakia ==
- Klokočov, Čadca District, a municipality and village in the Žilina Region
- Klokočov, Michalovce District, a municipality and village in the Košice Region
