= Onšov =

Onšov may refer to places in the Czech Republic:

- Onšov (Pelhřimov District), a municipality and village in the Vysočina Region
- Onšov (Znojmo District), a municipality and village in the South Moravian Region
