= Lesonice =

Lesonice may refer to places in the Czech Republic:

- Lesonice (Třebíč District), a municipality and village in the Vysočina Region
- Lesonice (Znojmo District), a municipality and village in the South Moravian Region
