= Loucka =

Loucka or Loučka may refer to:

== Places in the Czech Republic ==
- Loucká, a municipality and village in the Central Bohemian Region
- Loučka (Olomouc District), a municipality and village in the Olomouc Region
- Loučka (Vsetín District), a municipality and village in the Zlín Region
- Loučka (Zlín District), a municipality and village in the Zlín Region
- Loučka, a town part of Nový Jičín in the Moravian-Silesian Region
- Lipník nad Bečvou VI-Loučka, a village and part of Lipník nad Bečvou in the Olomouc Region
- Loučka, alternative name of the Bobrůvka (river)

== People ==
- David Loucka, American screenwriter
- Luboš Loučka, Czech footballer

== See also ==
- Loučky
- Dlouhá Loučka (disambiguation)
