= Třebenice =

Třebenice may refer to places in the Czech Republic:

- Třebenice (Litoměřice District), a town in the Ústí nad Labem Region
- Třebenice (Třebíč District), a municipality and village in the Vysočina Region
- Třebenice, a village and part of Štěchovice in the Central Bohemian Region
