= Budeč =

Budeč or Budec may refer to:

== People ==
- Budec, Župan of Bribir, count of Bribir, Croatia in the 11th century

== Places in the Czech Republic ==
- Budeč (Jindřichův Hradec District), a municipality and village in the South Bohemian Region
- Budeč (Žďár nad Sázavou District), a municipality and village in the Vysočina Region
- Budeč (gord), an early medieval settlement in Central Bohemia
- Budeč, a village and part of Hněvkovice in the Vysočina Region
- Budeč, a village and part of Úněšov in the Plzeň Region
