= Dlouhá Loučka =

Dlouhá Loučka may refer to places in the Czech Republic:

- Dlouhá Loučka (Olomouc District), a municipality and village in the Olomouc Region
- Dlouhá Loučka (Svitavy District), a municipality and village in the Pardubice Region
