= Lesonice (Znojmo District) =

- Municipality
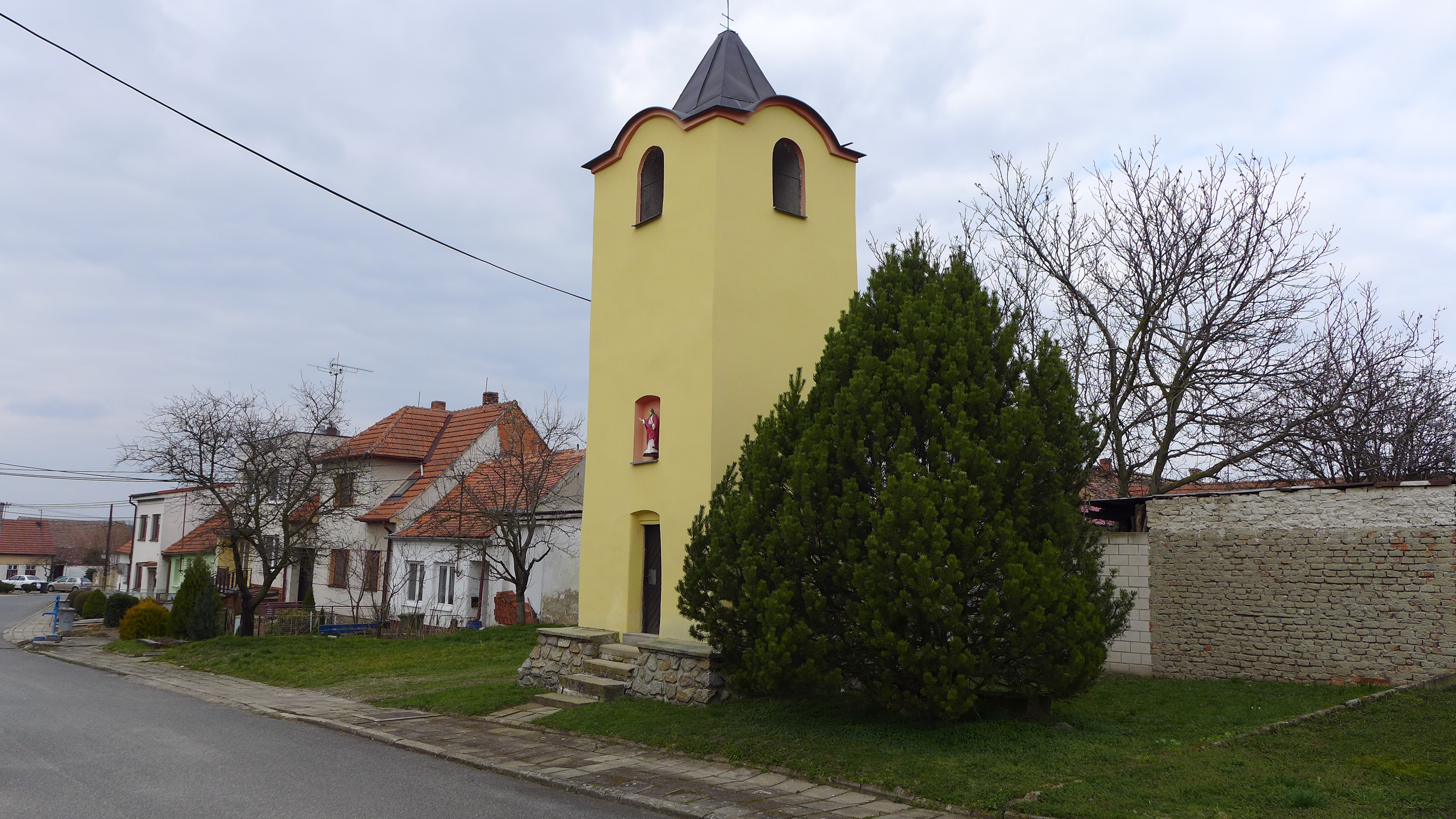
- Belfry

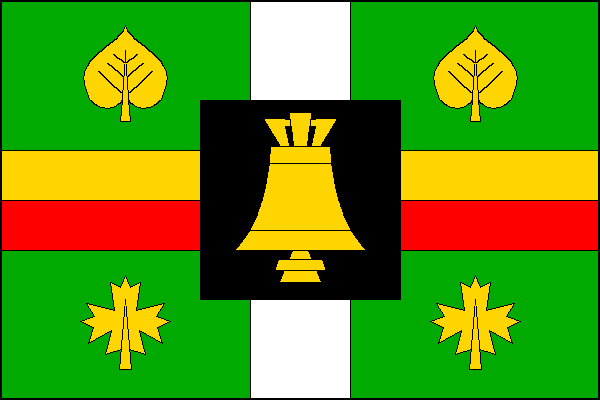
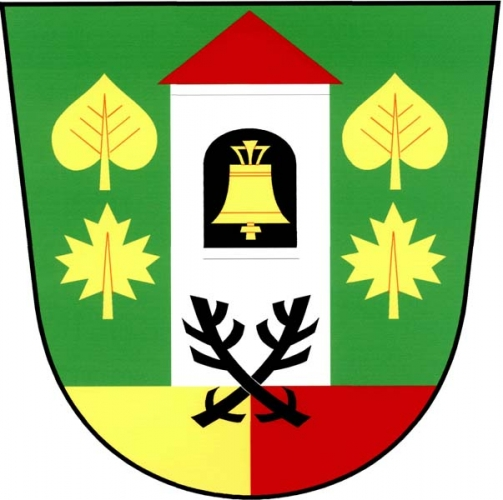
- Flag Coat of arms

- Location in the Czech Republic
- Coordinates: 49°0′12″N 16°18′38″E
- Country: Czech Republic
- Region: South Moravian
- District: Znojmo
- First mentioned: 1190

Area
  - Total: 6.60 km^{2} (2.55 sq mi)
- Elevation: 269 m (883 ft)

Population (2026-01-01)
  - Total: 252
  - Density: 38.2/km^{2} (98.9/sq mi)
- Time zone: UTC+1 (CET)
  - Summer (DST): UTC+2 (CEST)
- Postal code: 672 01
- Website: lesonicemk.cz

Lesonice is a municipality and village in Znojmo District in the South Moravian Region of the Czech Republic. It has about 300 inhabitants.

Lesonice lies approximately 27 kilometres (17 mi) north-east of Znojmo, 31 km (19 mi) south-west of Brno, and 183 km (114 mi) south-east of Prague.

== Demographics ==
Historical population
Year	Pop.	±%
1869	265	—
1880	293	+10.6%
1890	300	+2.4%
1900	339	+13.0%
1910	358	+5.6%
1921	408	+14.0%
1930	368	−9.8%
1950	342	−7.1%
1961	332	−2.9%
1970	307	−7.5%
1980	281	−8.5%
1991	222	−21.0%
2001	178	−19.8%
2011	198	+11.2%
2021	239	+20.7%
Source: Censuses
