= Otín (Jihlava District) =

- Municipality
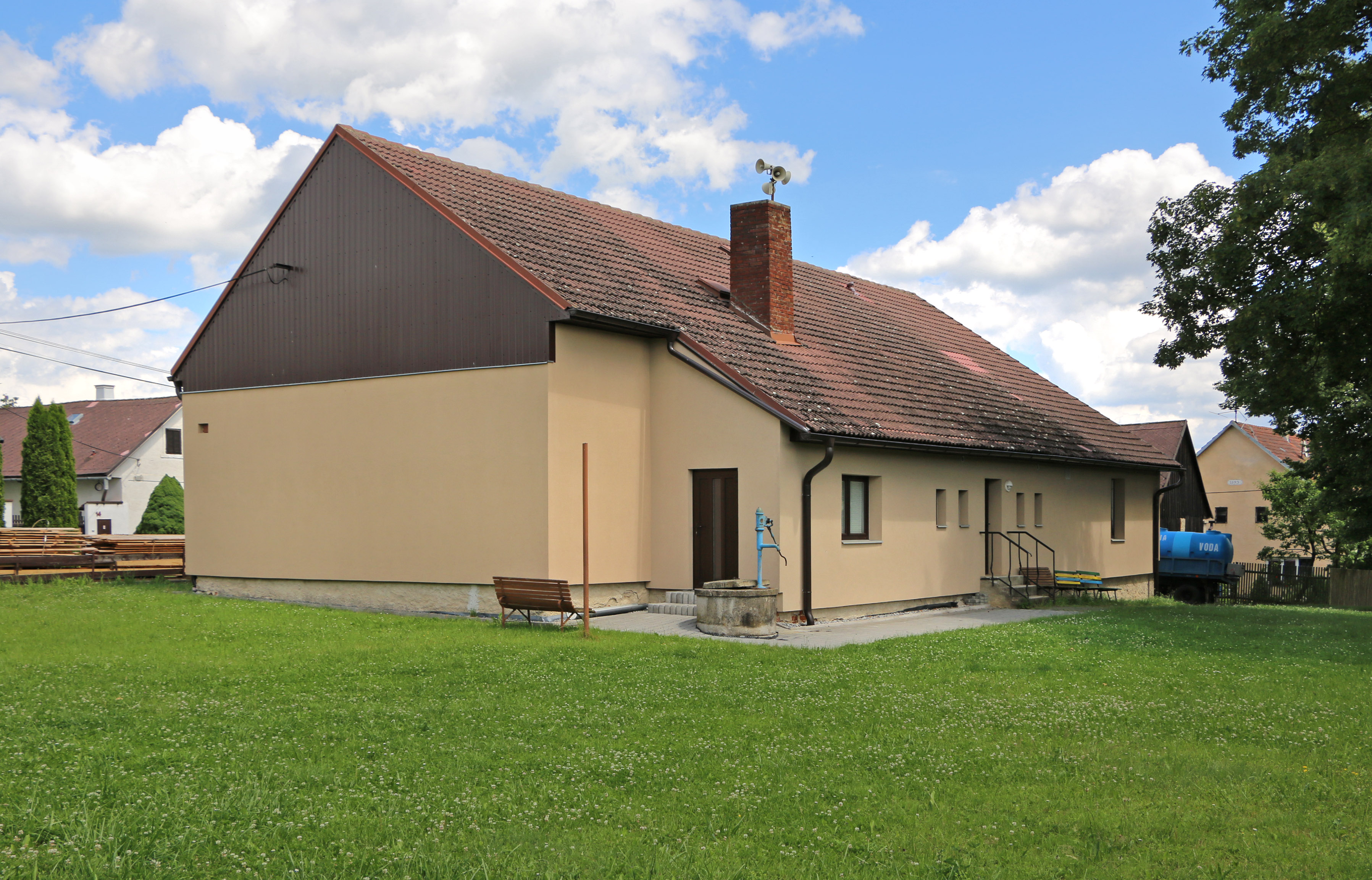
- Municipal office

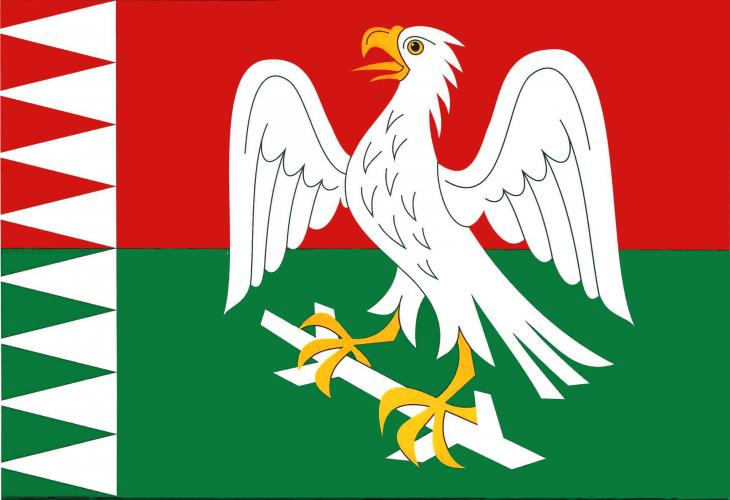
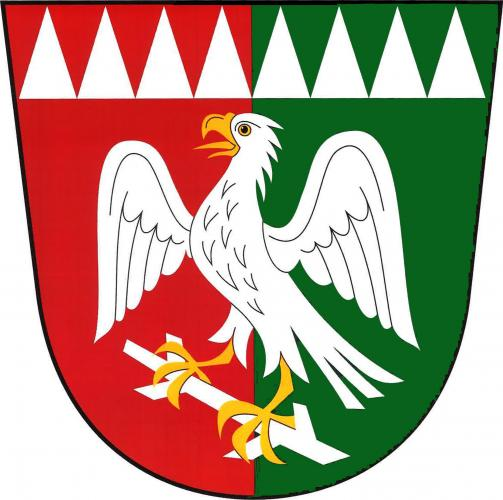
- Flag Coat of arms

- Location in the Czech Republic
- Coordinates: 49°16′0″N 15°34′11″E
- Country: Czech Republic
- Region: Vysočina
- District: Jihlava
- First mentioned: 1360

Area
  - Total: 7.17 km^{2} (2.77 sq mi)
- Elevation: 625 m (2,051 ft)

Population (2026-01-01)
  - Total: 86
  - Density: 12/km^{2} (31/sq mi)
- Time zone: UTC+1 (CET)
  - Summer (DST): UTC+2 (CEST)
- Postal codes: 588 33
- Website: www.obec-otin.cz

Otín (Czech pronunciation: [ˈociːn]; German: Otten) is a municipality and village in Jihlava District in the Vysočina Region of the Czech Republic. It has about 90 inhabitants.

Otín lies approximately 14 kilometres (9 mi) south of Jihlava and 123 km (76 mi) south-east of Prague.

== Demographics ==
Historical population
Year	Pop.	±%
1869	258	—
1880	253	−1.9%
1890	215	−15.0%
1900	189	−12.1%
1910	188	−0.5%
1921	182	−3.2%
1930	165	−9.3%
1950	134	−18.8%
1961	141	+5.2%
1970	118	−16.3%
1980	96	−18.6%
1991	97	+1.0%
2001	85	−12.4%
2011	77	−9.4%
2021	83	+7.8%
Source: Censuses
