= Blatnice (Třebíč District) =

- Municipality
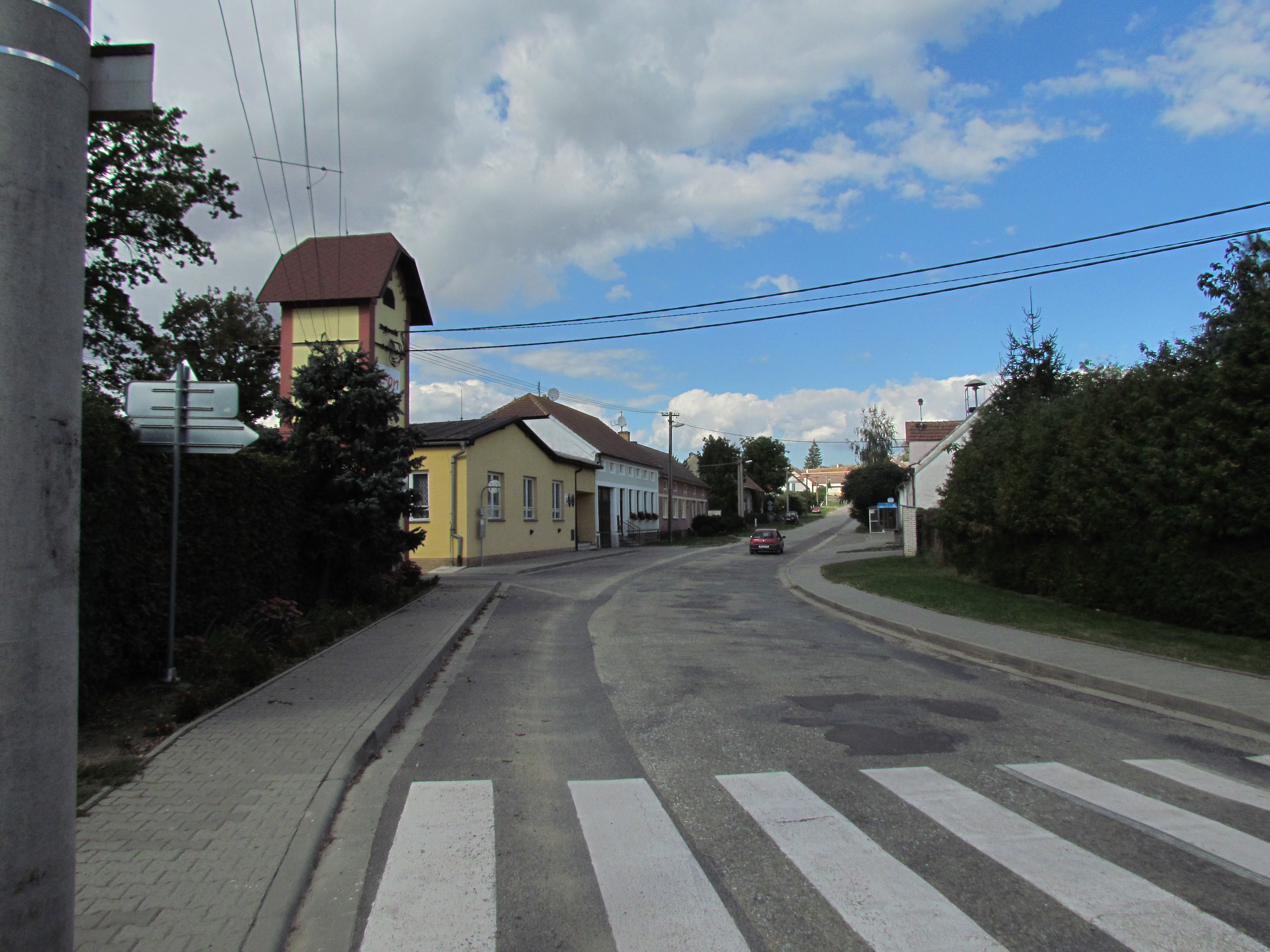
- Centre of Blatnice

- Flag Coat of arms

- Location in the Czech Republic
- Coordinates: 49°4′13″N 15°52′17″E
- Country: Czech Republic
- Region: Vysočina
- District: Třebíč
- First mentioned: 1466

Area
  - Total: 9.40 km^{2} (3.63 sq mi)
- Elevation: 427 m (1,401 ft)

Population (2026-01-01)
  - Total: 385
  - Density: 41.0/km^{2} (106/sq mi)
- Time zone: UTC+1 (CET)
  - Summer (DST): UTC+2 (CEST)
- Postal code: 675 51
- Website: www.obec-blatnice.cz

Blatnice is a municipality and village in Třebíč District in the Vysočina Region of the Czech Republic. It has about 400 inhabitants.

Blatnice lies approximately 17 kilometres (11 mi) south of Třebíč, 42 km (26 mi) south-east of Jihlava, and 154 km (96 mi) south-east of Prague.

== Demographics ==
Historical population
Year	Pop.	±%
1869	421	—
1880	482	+14.5%
1890	504	+4.6%
1900	456	−9.5%
1910	482	+5.7%
1921	471	−2.3%
1930	462	−1.9%
1950	444	−3.9%
1961	438	−1.4%
1970	431	−1.6%
1980	416	−3.5%
1991	381	−8.4%
2001	383	+0.5%
2011	352	−8.1%
2021	356	+1.1%
Source: Censuses
