= Otín (Žďár nad Sázavou District) =

- Municipality
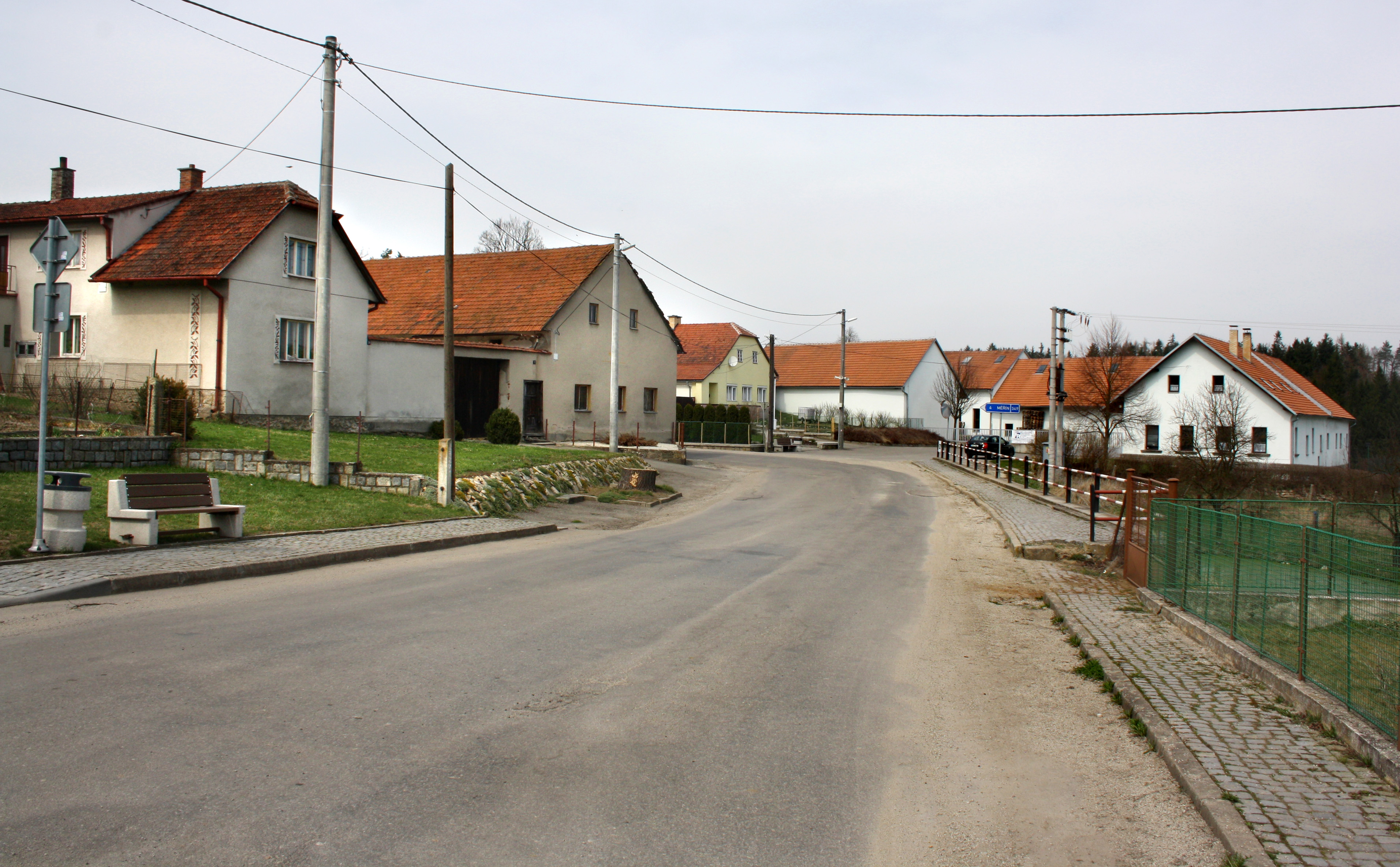
- Centre of Otín

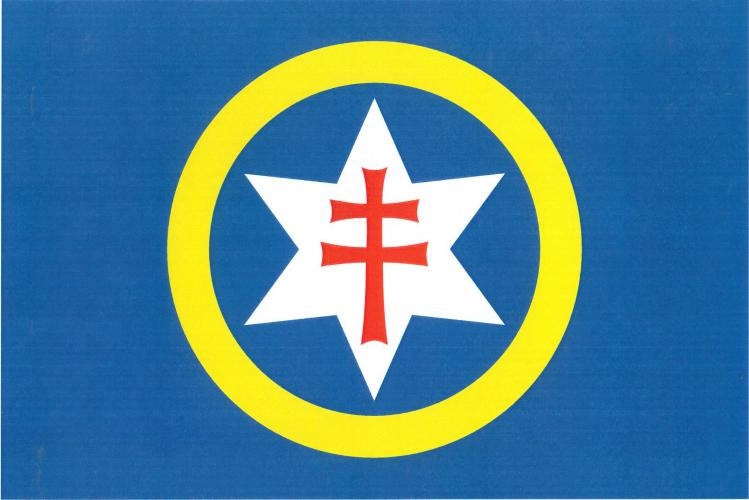
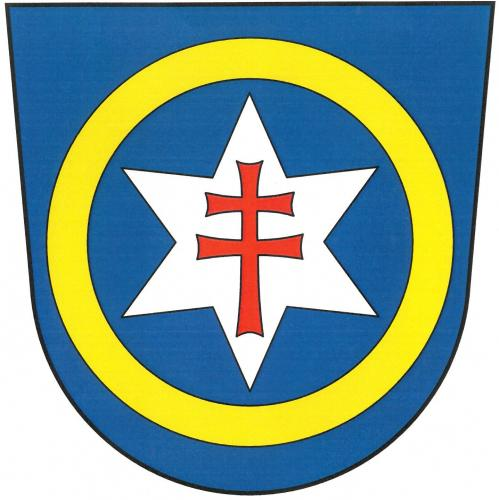
- Flag Coat of arms

- Location in the Czech Republic
- Coordinates: 49°21′46″N 15°54′24″E
- Country: Czech Republic
- Region: Vysočina
- District: Žďár nad Sázavou
- First mentioned: 1379

Area
  - Total: 5.56 km^{2} (2.15 sq mi)
- Elevation: 514 m (1,686 ft)

Population (2026-01-01)
  - Total: 334
  - Density: 60.1/km^{2} (156/sq mi)
- Time zone: UTC+1 (CET)
  - Summer (DST): UTC+2 (CEST)
- Postal code: 594 01
- Website: www.otin.cz

Otín is a municipality and village in Žďár nad Sázavou District in the Vysočina Region of the Czech Republic. It has about 300 inhabitants.

Otín lies approximately 23 kilometres (14 mi) south of Žďár nad Sázavou, 23 km (14 mi) east of Jihlava, and 134 km (83 mi) south-east of Prague.

== Administrative division ==
Otín consists of three municipal parts (in brackets population according to the 2021 census):

- Otín (186)
- Geršov (54)
- Pohořílky (86)

== Demographics ==
Historical population
Year	Pop.	±%
1869	329	—
1880	340	+3.3%
1890	353	+3.8%
1900	375	+6.2%
1910	353	−5.9%
1921	326	−7.6%
1930	367	+12.6%
1950	318	−13.4%
1961	301	−5.3%
1970	287	−4.7%
1980	296	+3.1%
1991	258	−12.8%
2001	266	+3.1%
2011	271	+1.9%
2021	326	+20.3%
Source: Censuses
