= Rozsochatec =

- Municipality
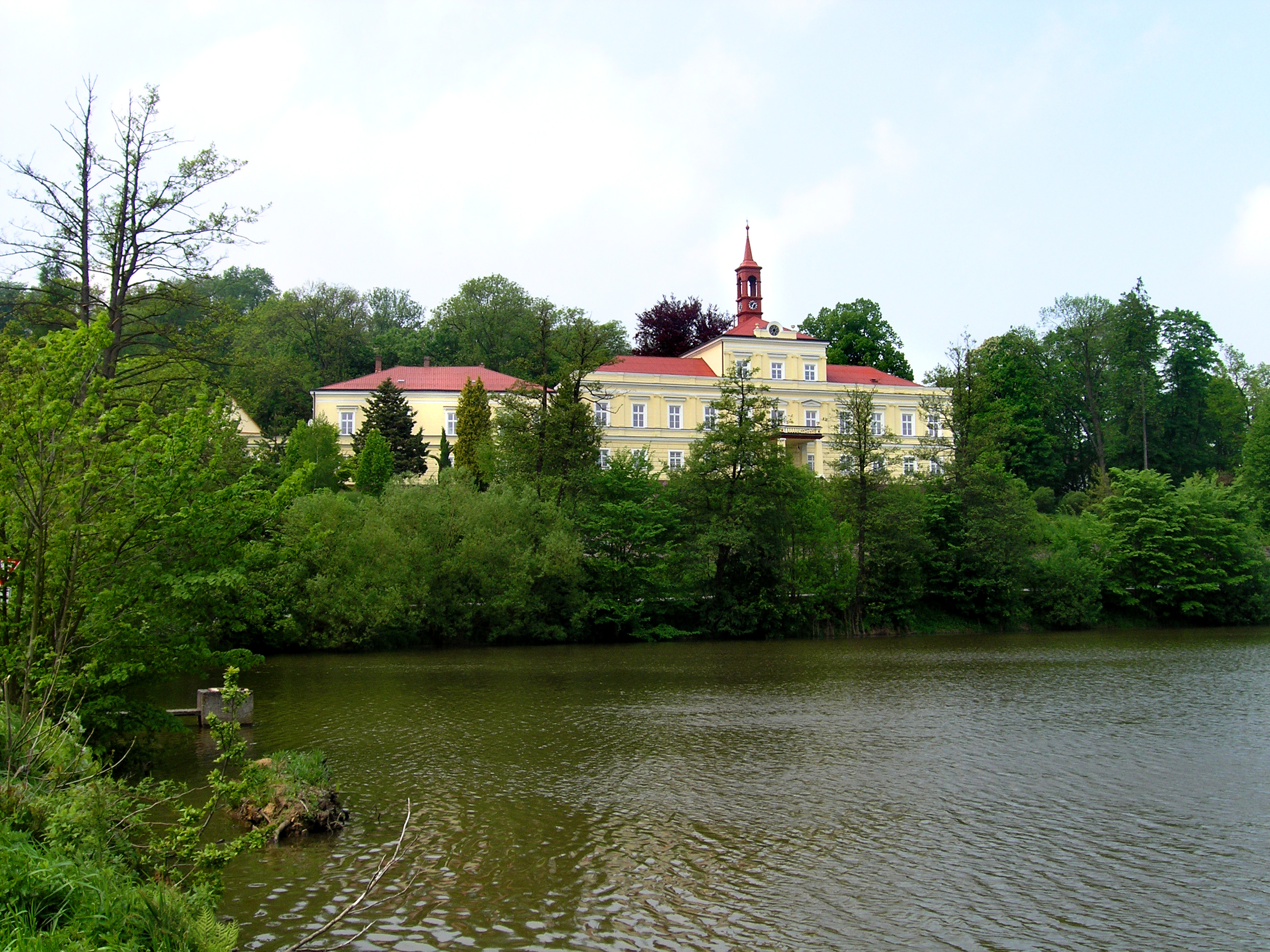
- Rozsochatec Castle

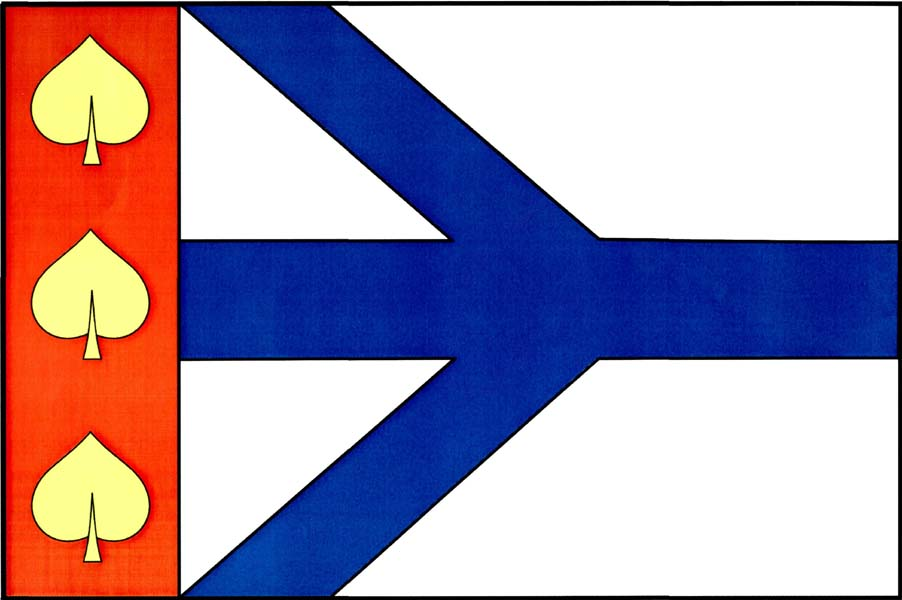
- Flag Coat of arms

- Location in the Czech Republic
- Coordinates: 49°40′21″N 15°38′2″E
- Country: Czech Republic
- Region: Vysočina
- District: Havlíčkův Brod
- First mentioned: 1283

Area
  - Total: 9.25 km^{2} (3.57 sq mi)
- Elevation: 480 m (1,570 ft)

Population (2026-01-01)
  - Total: 538
  - Density: 58.2/km^{2} (151/sq mi)
- Time zone: UTC+1 (CET)
  - Summer (DST): UTC+2 (CEST)
- Postal codes: 580 01, 582 72
- Website: rozsochatec.cz

Rozsochatec is a municipality and village in Havlíčkův Brod District in the Vysočina Region of the Czech Republic. It has about 500 inhabitants.

Rozsochatec lies approximately 10 kilometres (6 mi) north-east of Havlíčkův Brod, 32 km (20 mi) north of Jihlava, and 98 km (61 mi) south-east of Prague.

== Administrative division ==
Rozsochatec consists of two municipal parts (in brackets population according to the 2021 census):

- Rozsochatec (449)
- Jahodov (31)

== History ==
The first written mention of Rozsochatec is from 1283.

== Demographics ==
Historical population
Year	Pop.	±%
1869	471	—
1880	460	−2.3%
1890	423	−8.0%
1900	440	+4.0%
1910	473	+7.5%
1921	515	+8.9%
1930	493	−4.3%
1950	397	−19.5%
1961	515	+29.7%
1970	512	−0.6%
1980	524	+2.3%
1991	526	+0.4%
2001	495	−5.9%
2011	505	+2.0%
2021	480	−5.0%
Source: Censuses
