= Dlouhá Loučka (Svitavy District) =

- Municipality
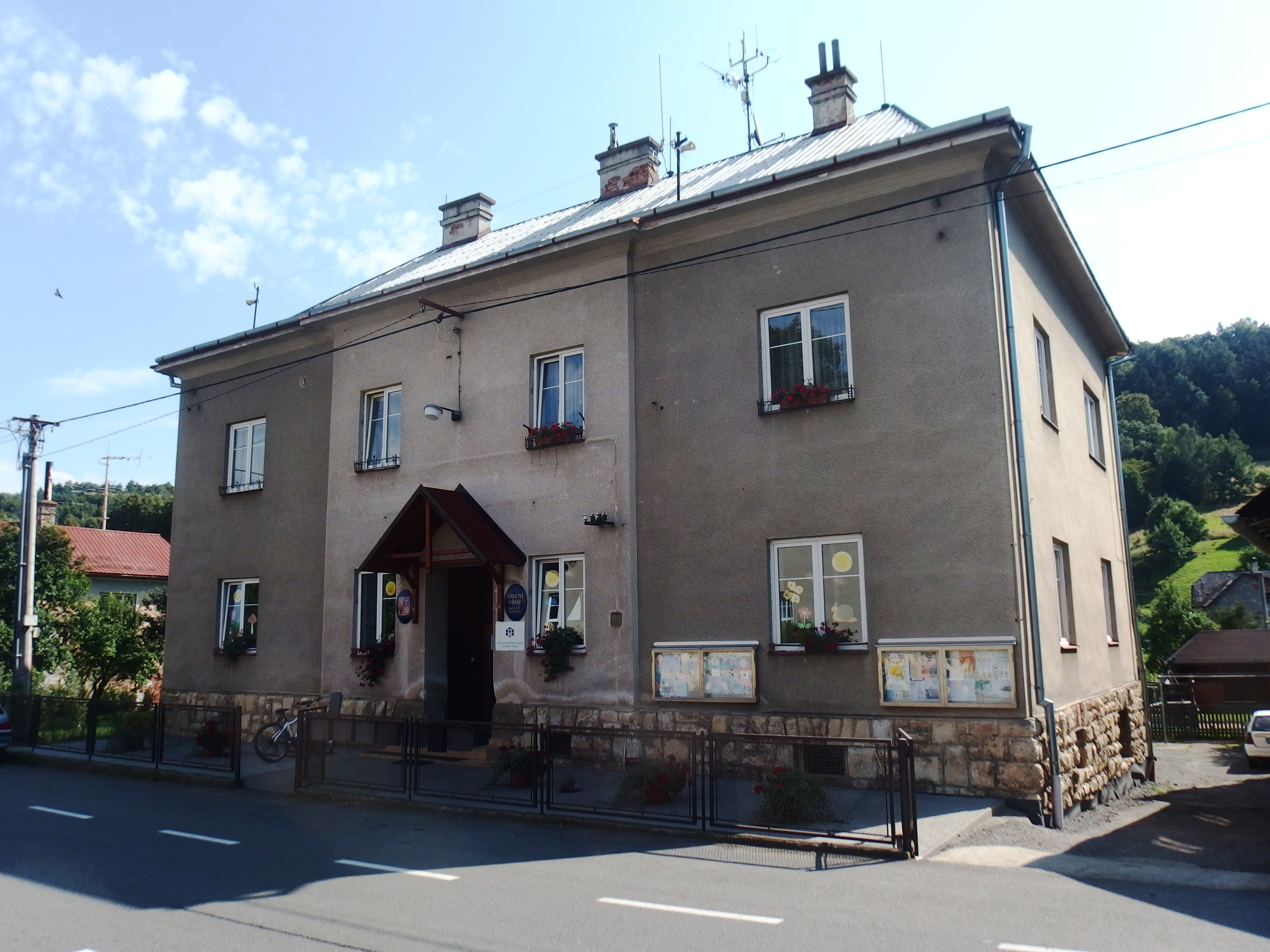
- Municipal office

- Flag Coat of arms

- Location in the Czech Republic
- Coordinates: 49°42′3″N 16°38′29″E
- Country: Czech Republic
- Region: Pardubice
- District: Svitavy
- First mentioned: 1365

Area
  - Total: 17.59 km^{2} (6.79 sq mi)
- Elevation: 398 m (1,306 ft)

Population (2026-01-01)
  - Total: 588
  - Density: 33.4/km^{2} (86.6/sq mi)
- Time zone: UTC+1 (CET)
  - Summer (DST): UTC+2 (CEST)
- Postal code: 569 43
- Website: www.obecdlouhaloucka.cz

Dlouhá Loučka (German: Langenlutsch) is a municipality and village in Svitavy District in the Pardubice Region of the Czech Republic. It has about 600 inhabitants.

Dlouhá Loučka lies approximately 13 kilometres (8 mi) south-east of Svitavy, 72 km (45 mi) south-east of Pardubice, and 164 km (102 mi) east of Prague.

== Demographics ==
Historical population
Year	Pop.	±%
1869	1,659	—
1880	1,684	+1.5%
1890	1,728	+2.6%
1900	1,681	−2.7%
1910	1,662	−1.1%
1921	1,515	−8.8%
1930	1,474	−2.7%
1950	720	−51.2%
1961	716	−0.6%
1970	630	−12.0%
1980	560	−11.1%
1991	573	+2.3%
2001	562	−1.9%
2011	534	−5.0%
2021	543	+1.7%
Source: Censuses
