= Rudolec =

- Municipality
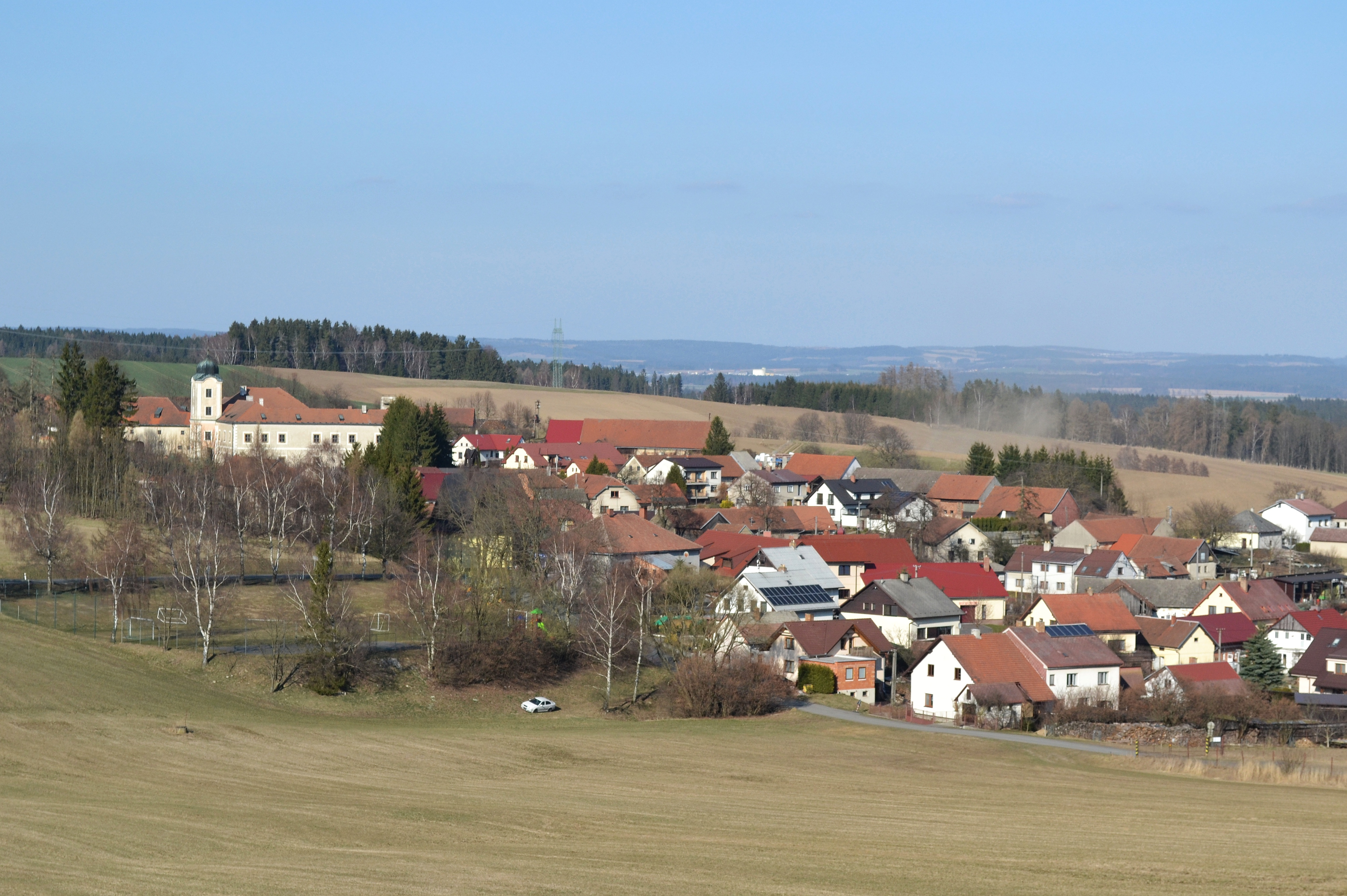
- View from the southwest

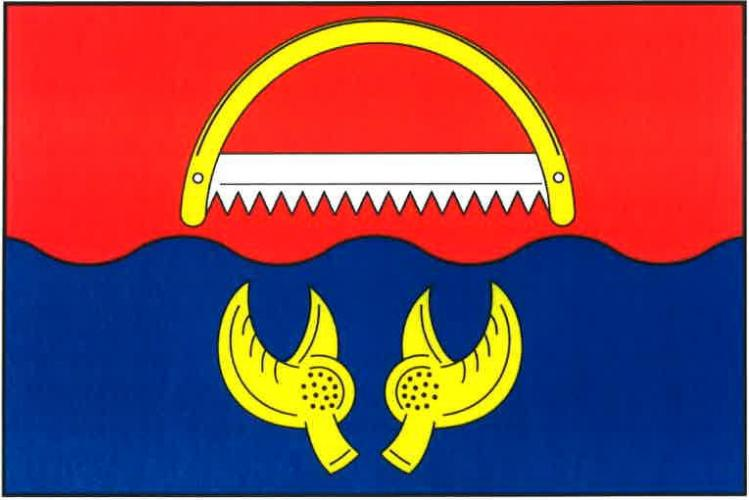
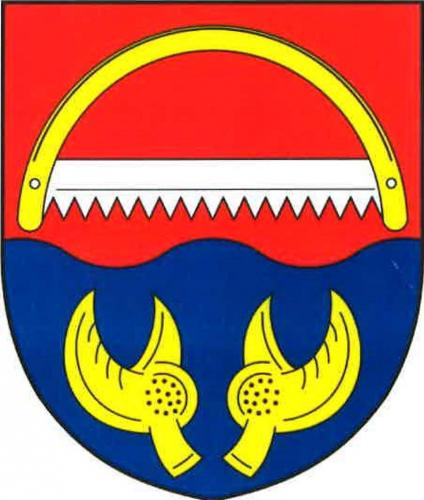
- Flag Coat of arms

- Location in the Czech Republic
- Coordinates: 49°28′37″N 15°49′49″E
- Country: Czech Republic
- Region: Vysočina
- District: Žďár nad Sázavou
- First mentioned: 1343

Area
  - Total: 9.38 km^{2} (3.62 sq mi)
- Elevation: 617 m (2,024 ft)

Population (2026-01-01)
  - Total: 235
  - Density: 25.1/km^{2} (64.9/sq mi)
- Time zone: UTC+1 (CET)
  - Summer (DST): UTC+2 (CEST)
- Postal code: 592 14
- Website: www.obec-rudolec.cz

Rudolec (until 1946 Německý Rudolec; German: Deutsch Rudoletz) is a municipality and village in Žďár nad Sázavou District in the Vysočina Region of the Czech Republic. It has about 200 inhabitants.

Rudolec lies approximately 12 kilometres (7 mi) south-west of Žďár nad Sázavou, 21 km (13 mi) north-east of Jihlava, and 122 km (76 mi) south-east of Prague.

== Demographics ==
Historical population
Year	Pop.	±%
1869	399	—
1880	444	+11.3%
1890	481	+8.3%
1900	457	−5.0%
1910	434	−5.0%
1921	427	−1.6%
1930	439	+2.8%
1950	299	−31.9%
1961	275	−8.0%
1970	237	−13.8%
1980	235	−0.8%
1991	192	−18.3%
2001	203	+5.7%
2011	213	+4.9%
2021	211	−0.9%
Source: Censuses
