= Onšov (Znojmo District) =

- Municipality
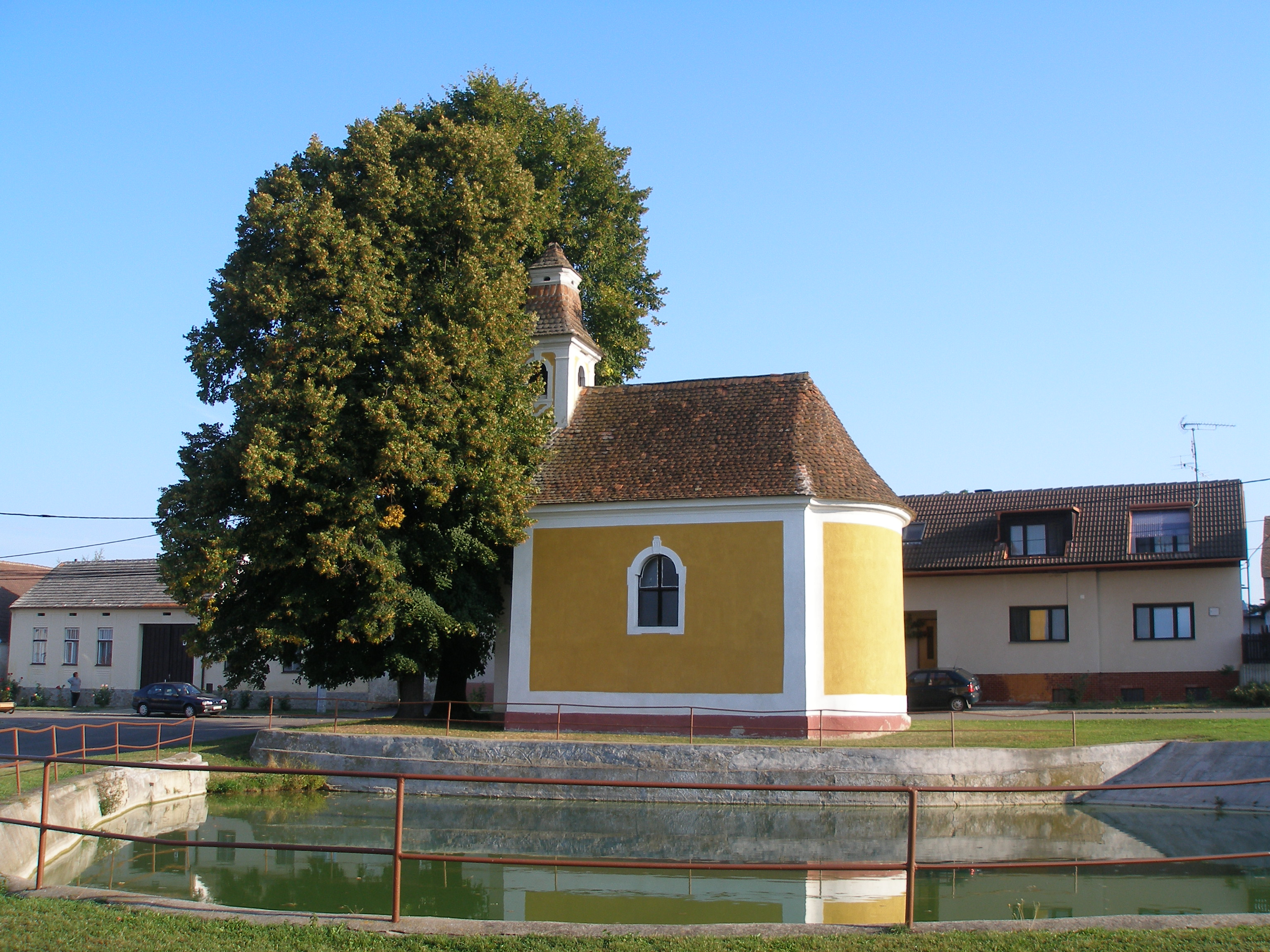
- Chapel of Saint Anne

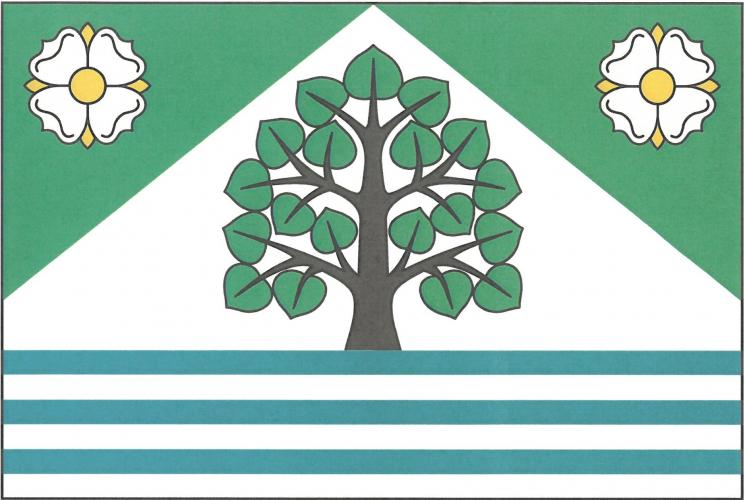
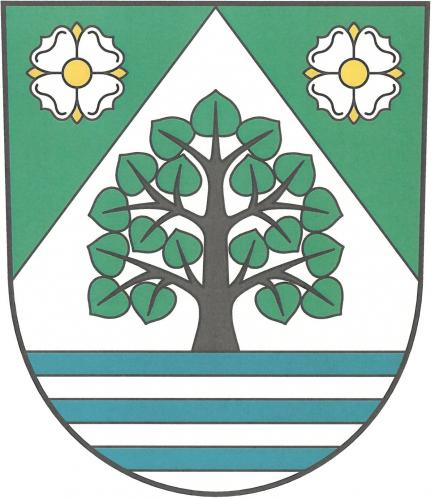
- Flag Coat of arms

- Location in the Czech Republic
- Coordinates: 48°54′19″N 15°50′3″E
- Country: Czech Republic
- Region: South Moravian
- District: Znojmo
- First mentioned: 1323

Area
  - Total: 5.58 km^{2} (2.15 sq mi)
- Elevation: 441 m (1,447 ft)

Population (2026-01-01)
  - Total: 76
  - Density: 14/km^{2} (35/sq mi)
- Time zone: UTC+1 (CET)
  - Summer (DST): UTC+2 (CEST)
- Postal code: 671 02
- Website: www.obeconsov.cz

Onšov (German: Windschau) is a municipality and village in Znojmo District in the South Moravian Region of the Czech Republic. It has about 80 inhabitants.

Onšov lies approximately 16 kilometres (10 mi) north-west of Znojmo, 66 km (41 mi) south-west of Brno, and 167 km (104 mi) south-east of Prague.

== Demographics ==
Historical population
Year	Pop.	±%
1869	131	—
1880	145	+10.7%
1890	165	+13.8%
1900	143	−13.3%
1910	130	−9.1%
1921	135	+3.8%
1930	234	+73.3%
1950	95	−59.4%
1961	119	+25.3%
1970	123	+3.4%
1980	98	−20.3%
1991	83	−15.3%
2001	71	−14.5%
2011	71	+0.0%
2021	65	−8.5%
Source: Censuses
