= Chřenovice =

- Municipality
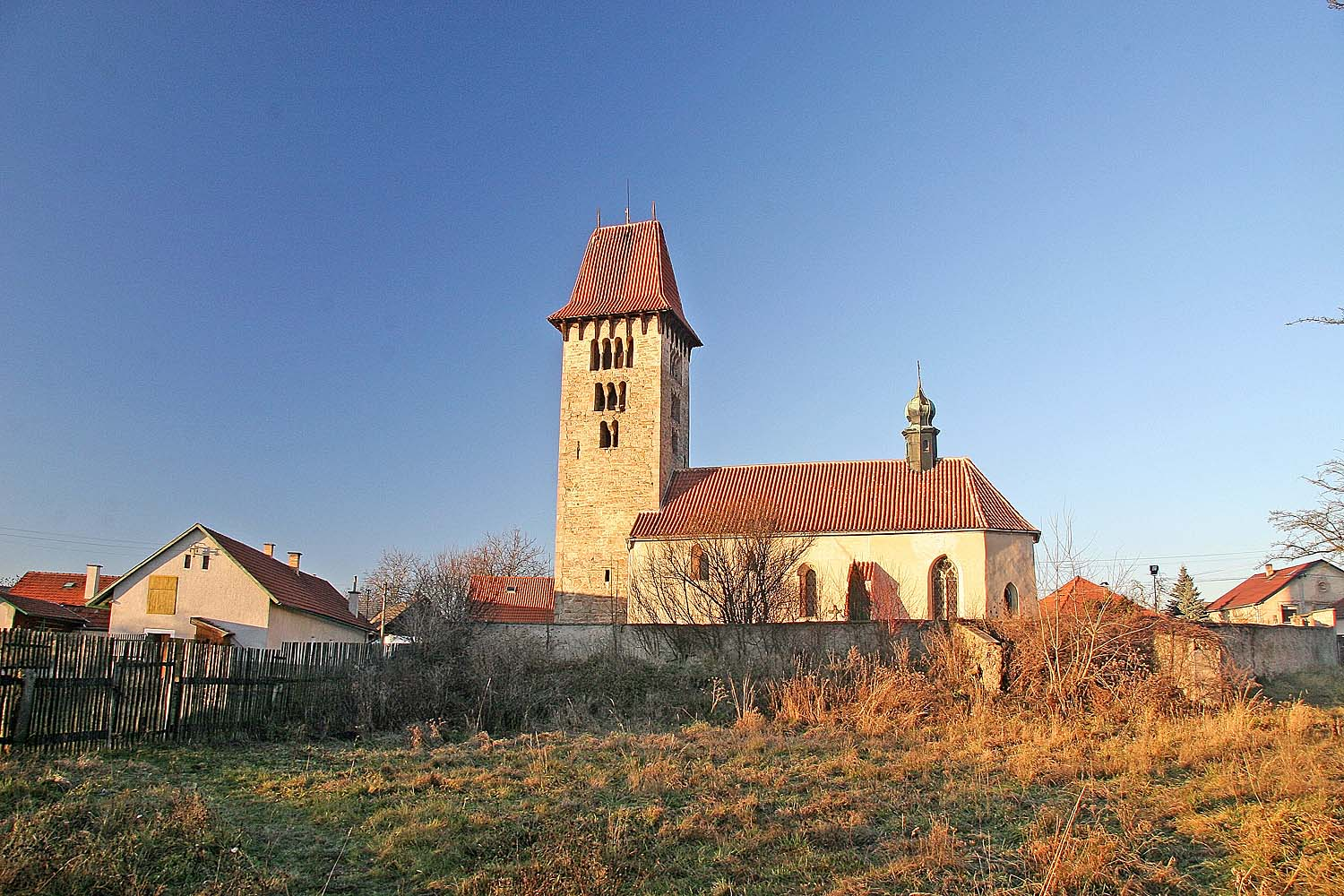
- Church of Saint Wenceslaus

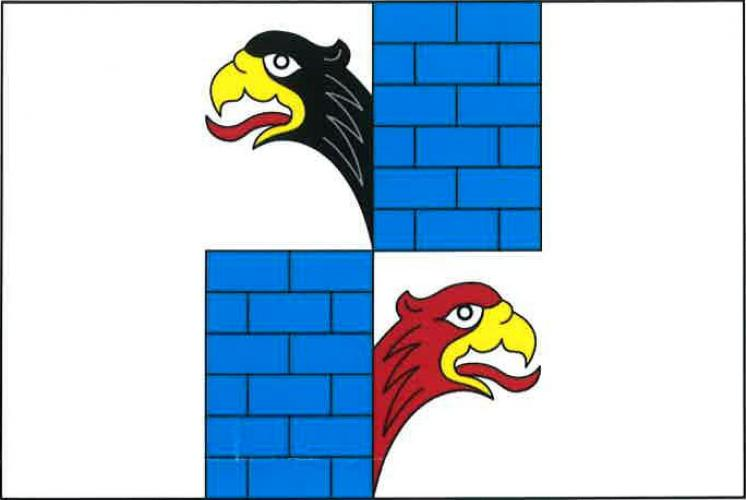
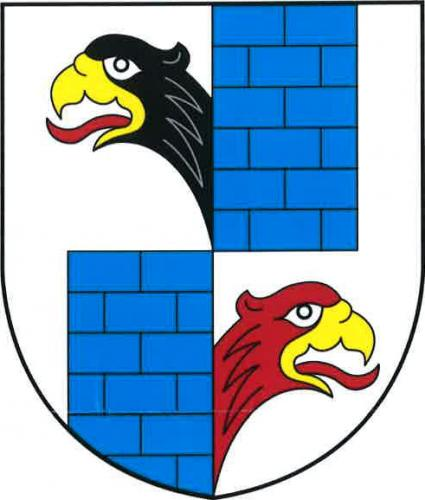
- Flag Coat of arms

- Location in the Czech Republic
- Coordinates: 49°36′3″N 15°4′1″E
- Country: Czech Republic
- Region: Vysočina
- District: Havlíčkův Brod
- First mentioned: 1216

Area
  - Total: 6.98 km^{2} (2.69 sq mi)
- Elevation: 457 m (1,499 ft)

Population (2026-01-01)
  - Total: 149
  - Density: 21.3/km^{2} (55.3/sq mi)
- Time zone: UTC+1 (CET)
  - Summer (DST): UTC+2 (CEST)
- Postal code: 584 01
- Website: www.chrenovice.cz

Chřenovice is a municipality and village in Havlíčkův Brod District in the Vysočina Region of the Czech Republic. It has about 100 inhabitants.

Chřenovice lies approximately 29 kilometres (18 mi) north-west of Havlíčkův Brod, 45 km (28 mi) north-west of Jihlava, and 71 km (44 mi) south-east of Prague.

== Demographics ==
Historical population
Year	Pop.	±%
1869	522	—
1880	531	+1.7%
1890	477	−10.2%
1900	431	−9.6%
1910	440	+2.1%
1921	429	−2.5%
1930	397	−7.5%
1950	307	−22.7%
1961	310	+1.0%
1970	245	−21.0%
1980	208	−15.1%
1991	196	−5.8%
2001	172	−12.2%
2011	153	−11.0%
2021	148	−3.3%
Source: Censuses
