= Klokočov, Michalovce District =

Village and municipality in Slovakia

Klokočov Hajagos
- Municipality
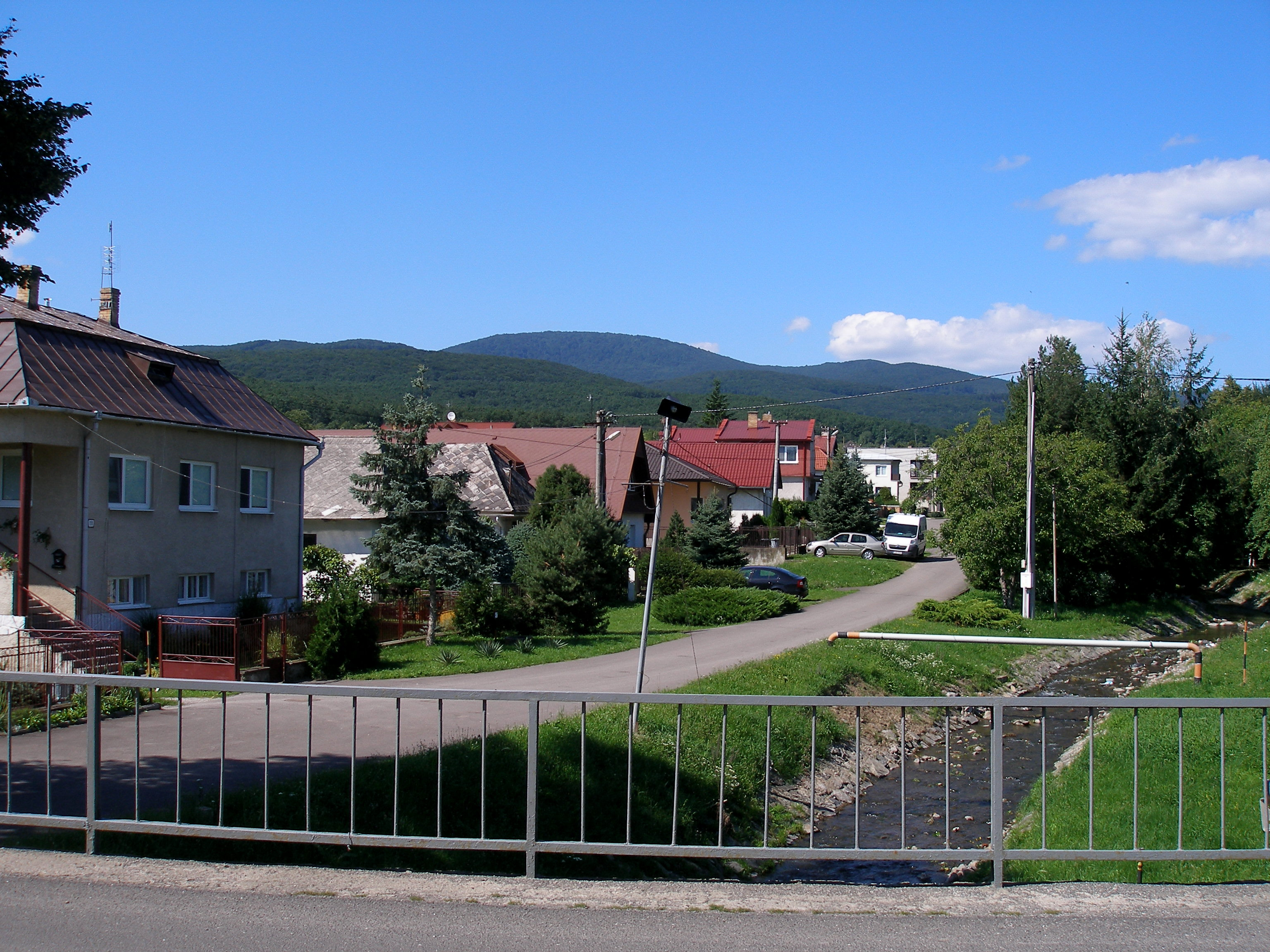

- Flag

- Location of Klokočov in the Košice Region Location of Klokočov in Slovakia
- Coordinates: 48.81°N 22.03°E
- Country: Slovakia
- Region: Košice Region
- District: Michalovce District
- First mentioned: 1358

Area
  - Total: 11.94 km^{2} (4.61 sq mi)
- Elevation: 138 m (453 ft)

Population (2025)
  - Total: 462
- Time zone: UTC+1 (CET)
  - Summer (DST): UTC+2 (CEST)
- Postal code: 723 6
- Area code: +421 56
- Vehicle registration plate (until 2022): MI
- Website: www.klokocovmi.sk

Klokočov (Slovak pronunciation: [ˈklɔkɔtʂɔw]; Hungarian: Hajagos) is a village and municipality in Michalovce District in the Košice Region of eastern Slovakia.

== History ==
In historical records the village was first mentioned in 1358. Before the establishment of independent Czechoslovakia in 1918, it was part of Ung County within the Kingdom of Hungary.

== Geography ==
The municipality lies at an altitude of 138 metres (453 ft) and covers an area of 11.94 km^{2} (4.61 sq mi) (2025).

== Population ==
Population statistic (10 years)
Year	1995	2005	2015	2025
Count	379	407	417	462
Difference		+7.38%	+2.45%	+10.79%

Population statistic
Year	2024	2025
Count	462	462
Difference		+0%

It has a population of 462 people (31 December 2025).

=== Ethnicity ===
Census 2021 (1+ %)
Ethnicity	Number	Fraction
Slovak	398	97.31%
Rusyn	9	2.2%
Other	5	1.22%
Total	409	

In year 2021 was 409 people by ethnicity 398 as Slovak, 9 as Rusyn, 5 as Other, 4 as Not found out, 3 as Romani, 2 as Czech, 1 as Ukrainian and 1 as English.

Note on population: The difference values of population numbers in the table "Population statistic" and in the sections "Ethnicity" & "Religion" is caused by the use of various statistical methods.

=== Religion ===
Census 2021 (1+ %)
Religion	Number	Fraction
Greek Catholic Church	245	59.9%
Roman Catholic Church	89	21.76%
None	40	9.78%
Not found out	14	3.42%
Evangelical Church	7	1.71%
Eastern Orthodox Church	6	1.47%
Total	409	

In year 2021 was 409 people by religion 245 from Greek Catholic Church, 89 from Roman Catholic Church, 40 from None, 14 from Not found out, 7 from Evangelical Church, 6 from Eastern Orthodox Church, 3 from Jehovah's Witnesses, 3 from Ad hoc movements and 2 from Calvinist Church.

== Culture ==
The village has a public library and a football pitch.

It is also a major religious pilgrimage site for Greek Catholics in the Košice Region, with the local Greek Catholic church as the centrepiece of pilgrimages.

== Genealogical resources ==
The records for genealogical research are available at the state archive "Statny Archiv in Presov, Slovakia"

- Roman Catholic church records (births/marriages/deaths): 1742-1935 (parish B)
- Greek Catholic church records (births/marriages/deaths): 1822-1922 (parish A)

== Transport ==
Klokočov lies next to a main road connecting Michalovce with the villages on the northern shore of Zemplínska Šírava and the villages in the northern parts of the Sobrance District, further to the east.

The village has a regular bus service.

== Tourism ==
A local part of the municipality is the Kamenec tourism area, with accommodation and facilities for water sports. Kamenec is one of the major recreational areas on the northern shores of the Zemplínska Šírava reservoir.

== See also ==
- List of municipalities and towns in Michalovce District
- List of municipalities and towns in Slovakia
