= Vlksice =

- Municipality
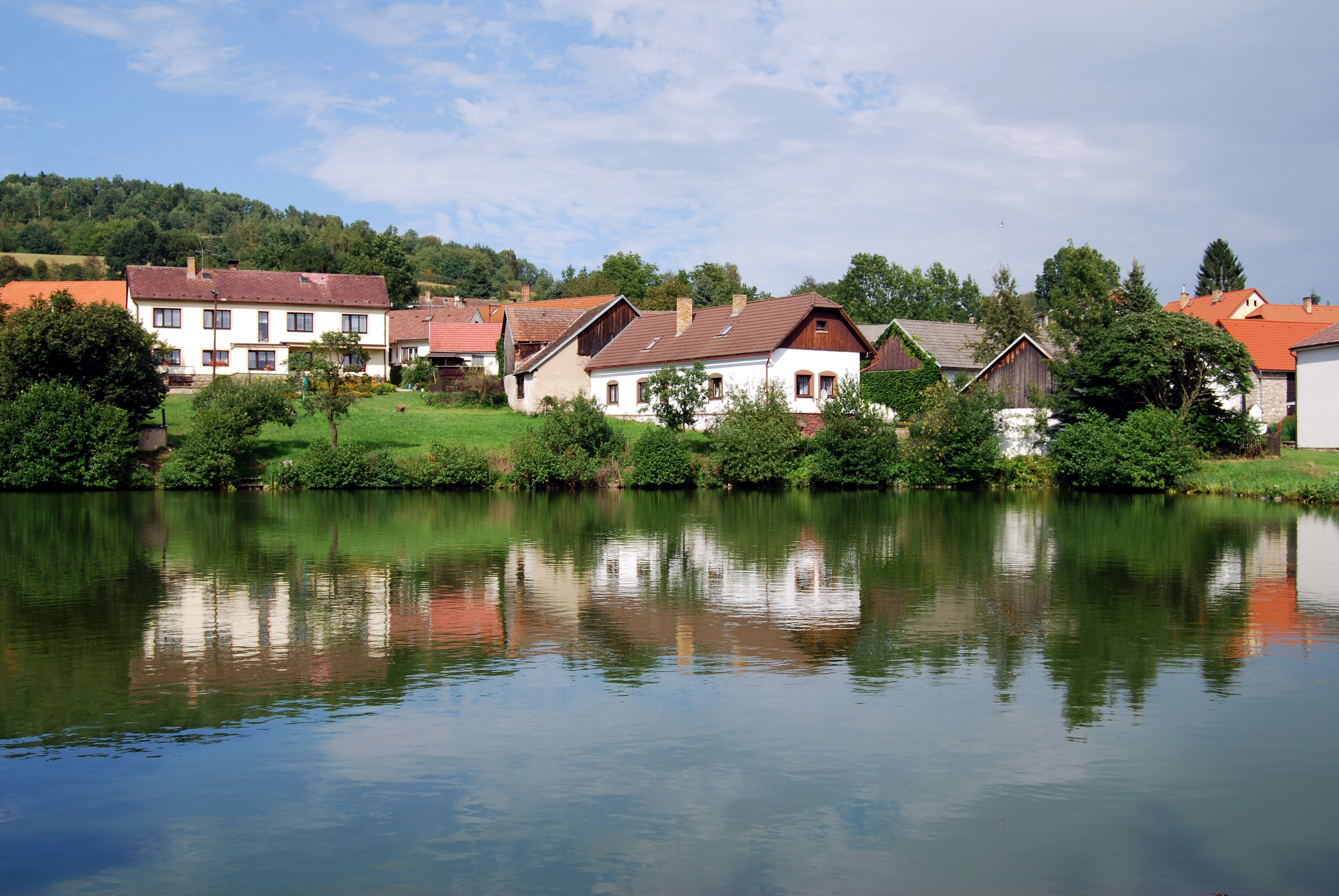
- A pond in Vlksice

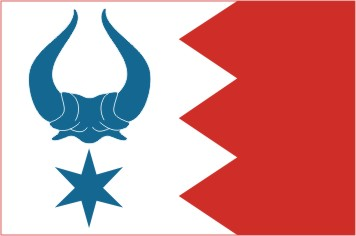
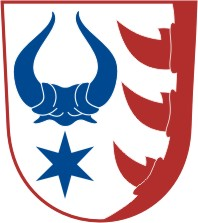
- Flag Coat of arms

- Location in the Czech Republic
- Coordinates: 49°28′52″N 14°26′28″E
- Country: Czech Republic
- Region: South Bohemian
- District: Písek
- First mentioned: 1291

Area
  - Total: 8.24 km^{2} (3.18 sq mi)
- Elevation: 475 m (1,558 ft)

Population (2026-01-01)
  - Total: 149
  - Density: 18.1/km^{2} (46.8/sq mi)
- Time zone: UTC+1 (CET)
  - Summer (DST): UTC+2 (CEST)
- Postal code: 399 01
- Website: www.obecvlksice.cz

Vlksice is a municipality and village in Písek District in the South Bohemian Region of the Czech Republic. It has about 100 inhabitants.

Vlksice lies approximately 30 kilometres (19 mi) north-east of Písek, 57 km (35 mi) north of České Budějovice, and 68 km (42 mi) south of Prague.

== Administrative division ==
Vlksice consists of four municipal parts (in brackets population according to the 2021 census):

- Vlksice (63)
- Dobřemilice (34)
- Klokočov (2)
- Střítež (42)

== Demographics ==
Historical population
| Year | Pop. | ±% |
|---|---|---|
| 1869 | 601 | — |
| 1880 | 559 | −7.0% |
| 1890 | 554 | −0.9% |
| 1900 | 487 | −12.1% |
| 1910 | 438 | −10.1% |
| 1921 | 472 | +7.8% |
| 1930 | 429 | −9.1% |
| 1950 | 312 | −27.3% |
| 1961 | 311 | −0.3% |
| 1970 | 246 | −20.9% |
| 1980 | 228 | −7.3% |
| 1991 | 188 | −17.5% |
| 2001 | 139 | −26.1% |
| 2011 | 137 | −1.4% |
| 2021 | 141 | +2.9% |
Source: Censuses
