= Pojbuky =

- Municipality
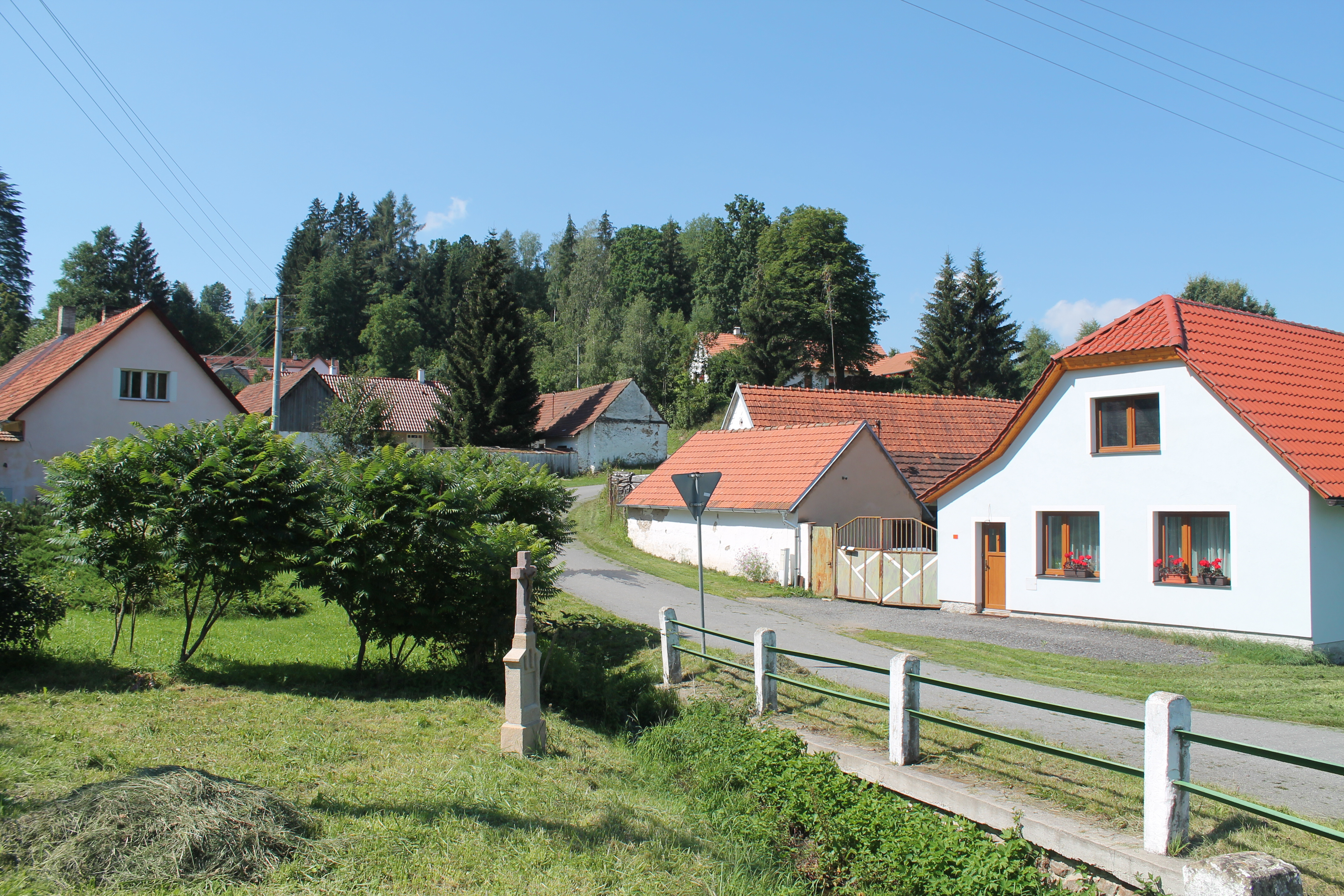
- Zadní Lomná, a part of Pojbuky

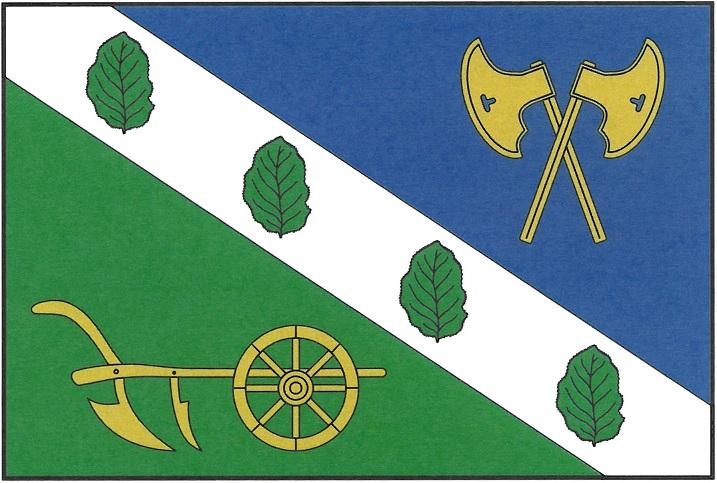
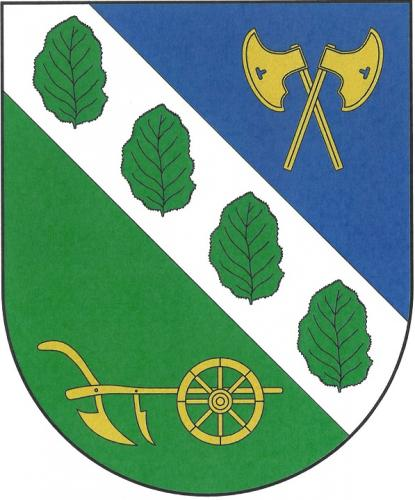
- Flag Coat of arms

- Location in the Czech Republic
- Coordinates: 49°29′45″N 14°53′48″E
- Country: Czech Republic
- Region: South Bohemian
- District: Tábor
- First mentioned: 1382

Area
  - Total: 7.38 km^{2} (2.85 sq mi)
- Elevation: 634 m (2,080 ft)

Population (2026-01-01)
  - Total: 100
  - Density: 14/km^{2} (35/sq mi)
- Time zone: UTC+1 (CET)
  - Summer (DST): UTC+2 (CEST)
- Postal code: 391 43
- Website: www.pojbuky.cz

Pojbuky is a municipality and village in Tábor District in the South Bohemian Region of the Czech Republic. It has about 100 inhabitants.

Pojbuky lies approximately 19 kilometres (12 mi) north-east of Tábor, 66 km (41 mi) north-east of České Budějovice, and 74 km (46 mi) south-east of Prague.

== Administrative division ==
Pojbuky consists of four municipal parts (in brackets population according to the 2021 census):

- Pojbuky (66)
- Blatnice (9)
- Dolní Světlá (2)
- Zadní Lomná (11)

== Demographics ==
Historical population
Year	Pop.	±%
1869	436	—
1880	467	+7.1%
1890	446	−4.5%
1900	402	−9.9%
1910	458	+13.9%
1921	473	+3.3%
1930	402	−15.0%
1950	260	−35.3%
1961	241	−7.3%
1970	208	−13.7%
1980	178	−14.4%
1991	155	−12.9%
2001	123	−20.6%
2011	107	−13.0%
2021	88	−17.8%
Source: Censuses
