= Třebenice (Třebíč District) =

- Municipality
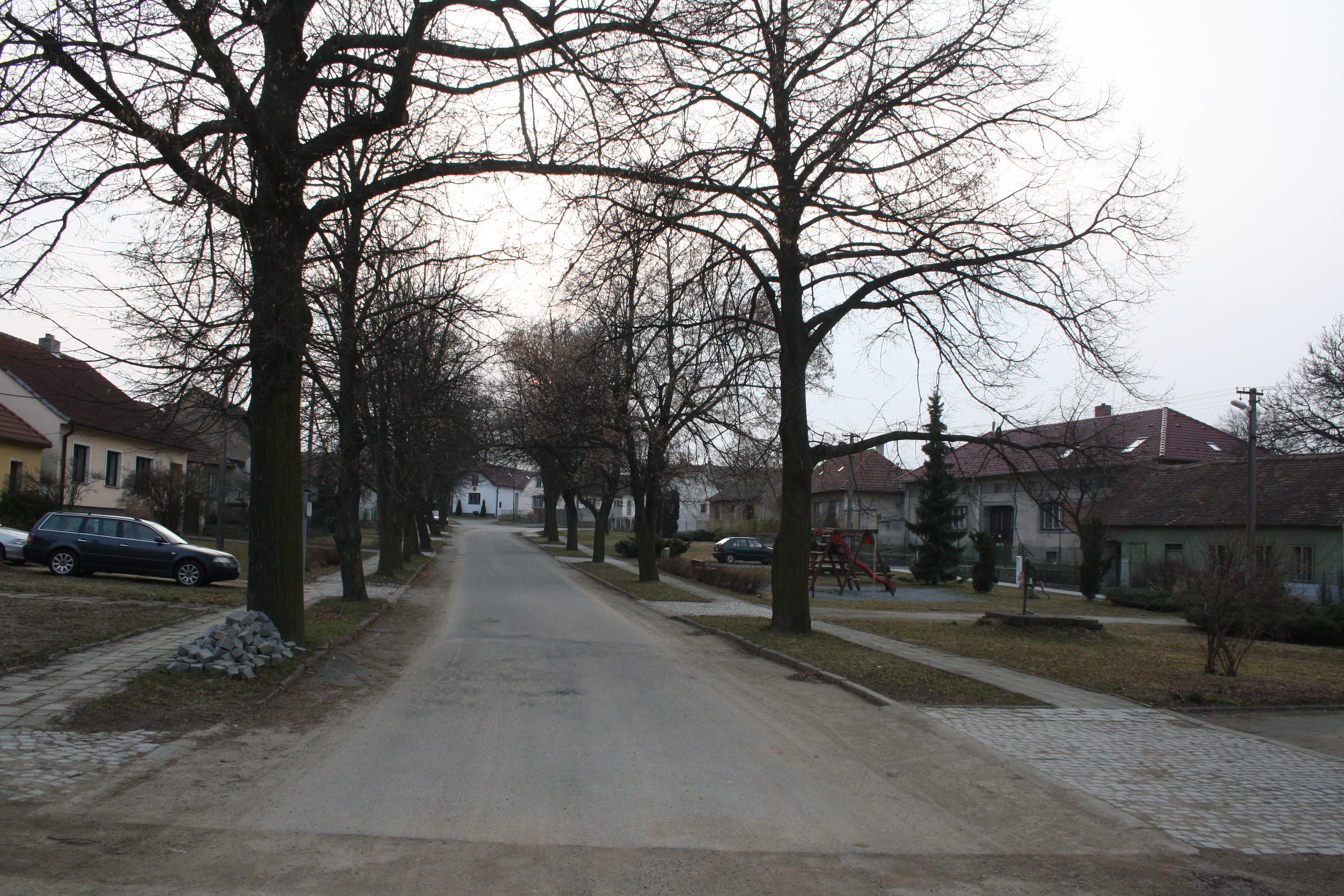
- Centre of Třebenice

- Flag Coat of arms

- Location in the Czech Republic
- Coordinates: 49°9′50″N 16°0′57″E
- Country: Czech Republic
- Region: Vysočina
- District: Třebíč
- First mentioned: 1564

Area
  - Total: 11.67 km^{2} (4.51 sq mi)
- Elevation: 495 m (1,624 ft)

Population (2026-01-01)
  - Total: 479
  - Density: 41.0/km^{2} (106/sq mi)
- Time zone: UTC+1 (CET)
  - Summer (DST): UTC+2 (CEST)
- Postal code: 675 52
- Website: www.obectrebenice.cz

Třebenice is a municipality and village in Třebíč District in the Vysočina Region of the Czech Republic. It has about 500 inhabitants.

Třebenice lies approximately 11 kilometres (7 mi) south-east of Třebíč, 40 km (25 mi) south-east of Jihlava, and 154 km (96 mi) south-east of Prague.

== Administrative division ==
Třebenice consists of three municipal parts (in brackets population according to the 2021 census):

- Třebenice (321)
- Chroustov (45)
- Plešice (71)

== Demographics ==
Historical population
Year	Pop.	±%
1869	499	—
1880	543	+8.8%
1890	534	−1.7%
1900	558	+4.5%
1910	591	+5.9%
1921	591	+0.0%
1930	586	−0.8%
1950	501	−14.5%
1961	547	+9.2%
1970	477	−12.8%
1980	422	−11.5%
1991	401	−5.0%
2001	423	+5.5%
2011	426	+0.7%
2021	437	+2.6%
Source: Censuses
