= Onšov (Pelhřimov District) =

- Municipality
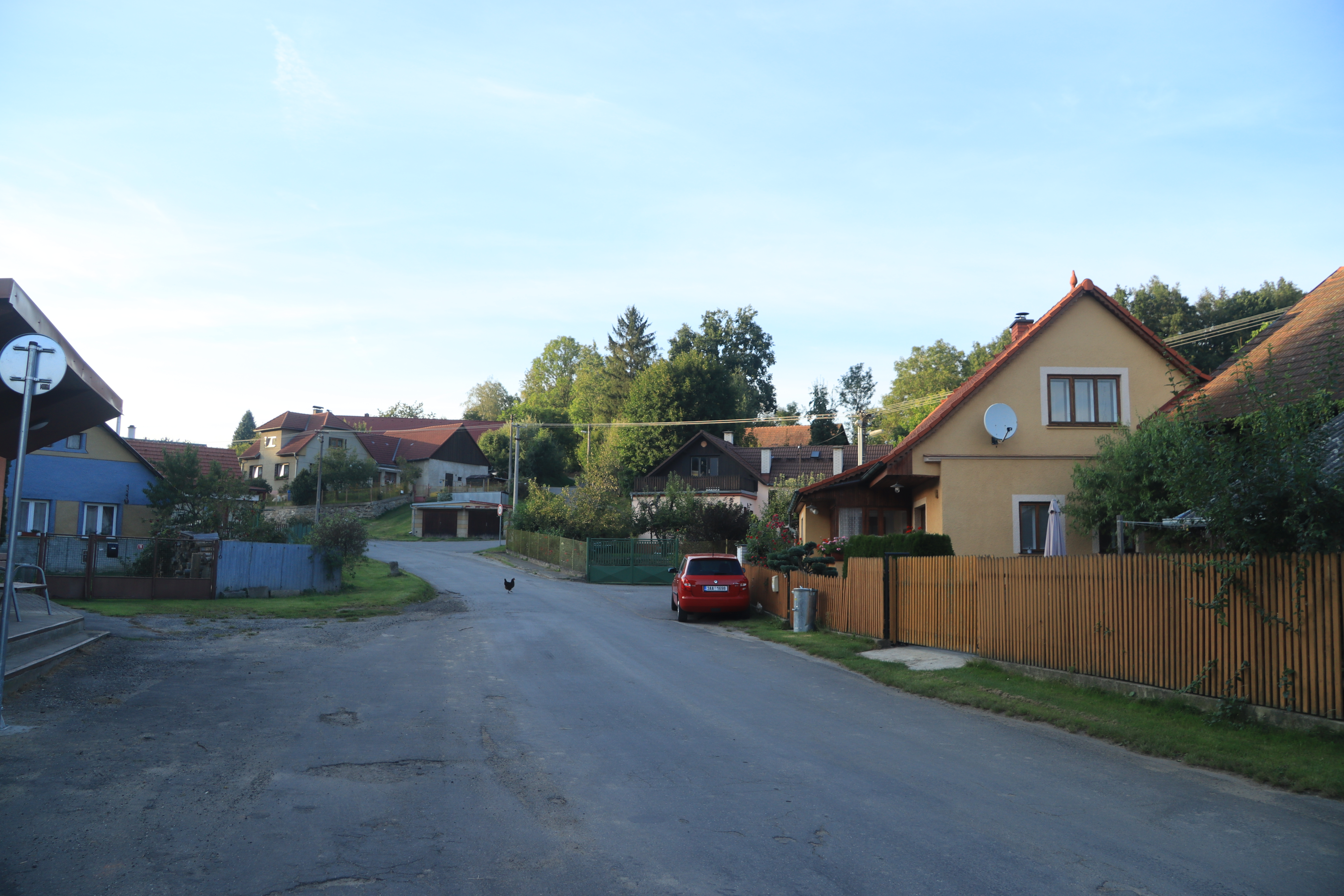
- Road through Onšov

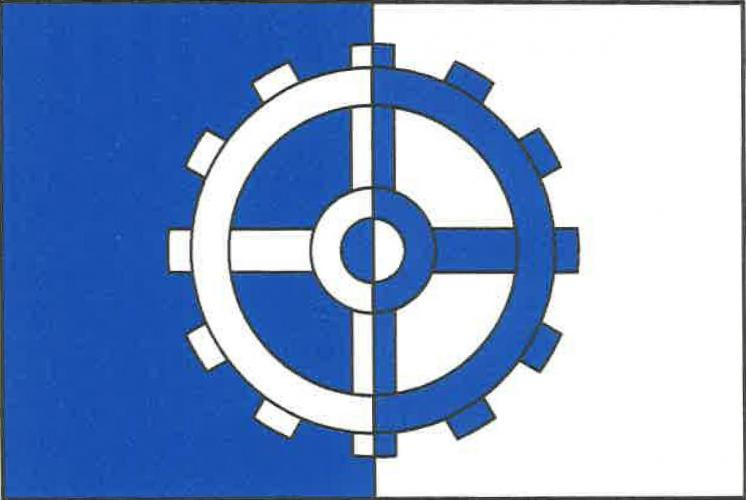
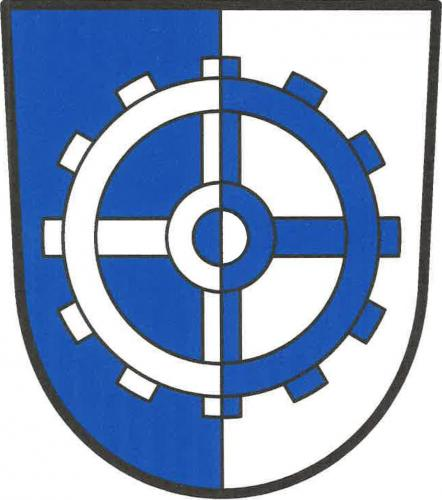
- Flag Coat of arms

- Location in the Czech Republic
- Coordinates: 49°34′42″N 15°8′11″E
- Country: Czech Republic
- Region: Vysočina
- District: Pelhřimov
- First mentioned: 1252

Area
  - Total: 9.98 km^{2} (3.85 sq mi)
- Elevation: 448 m (1,470 ft)

Population (2026-01-01)
  - Total: 224
  - Density: 22.4/km^{2} (58.1/sq mi)
- Time zone: UTC+1 (CET)
  - Summer (DST): UTC+2 (CEST)
- Postal code: 395 01
- Website: obec.onsov.cz

Onšov is a municipality and village in Pelhřimov District in the Vysočina Region of the Czech Republic. It has about 200 inhabitants.

Onšov lies approximately 17 kilometres (11 mi) north of Pelhřimov, 39 km (24 mi) north-west of Jihlava, and 77 km (48 mi) south-east of Prague.

== Administrative division ==
Onšov consists of three municipal parts (in brackets population according to the 2021 census):

- Onšov (192)
- Chlovy (12)
- Těškovice (29)

== Demographics ==
Historical population
Year	Pop.	±%
1869	749	—
1880	757	+1.1%
1890	724	−4.4%
1900	726	+0.3%
1910	694	−4.4%
1921	674	−2.9%
1930	558	−17.2%
1950	425	−23.8%
1961	432	+1.6%
1970	392	−9.3%
1980	357	−8.9%
1991	307	−14.0%
2001	244	−20.5%
2011	242	−0.8%
2021	233	−3.7%
Source: Censuses
