= Lesonice (Třebíč District) =

- Municipality
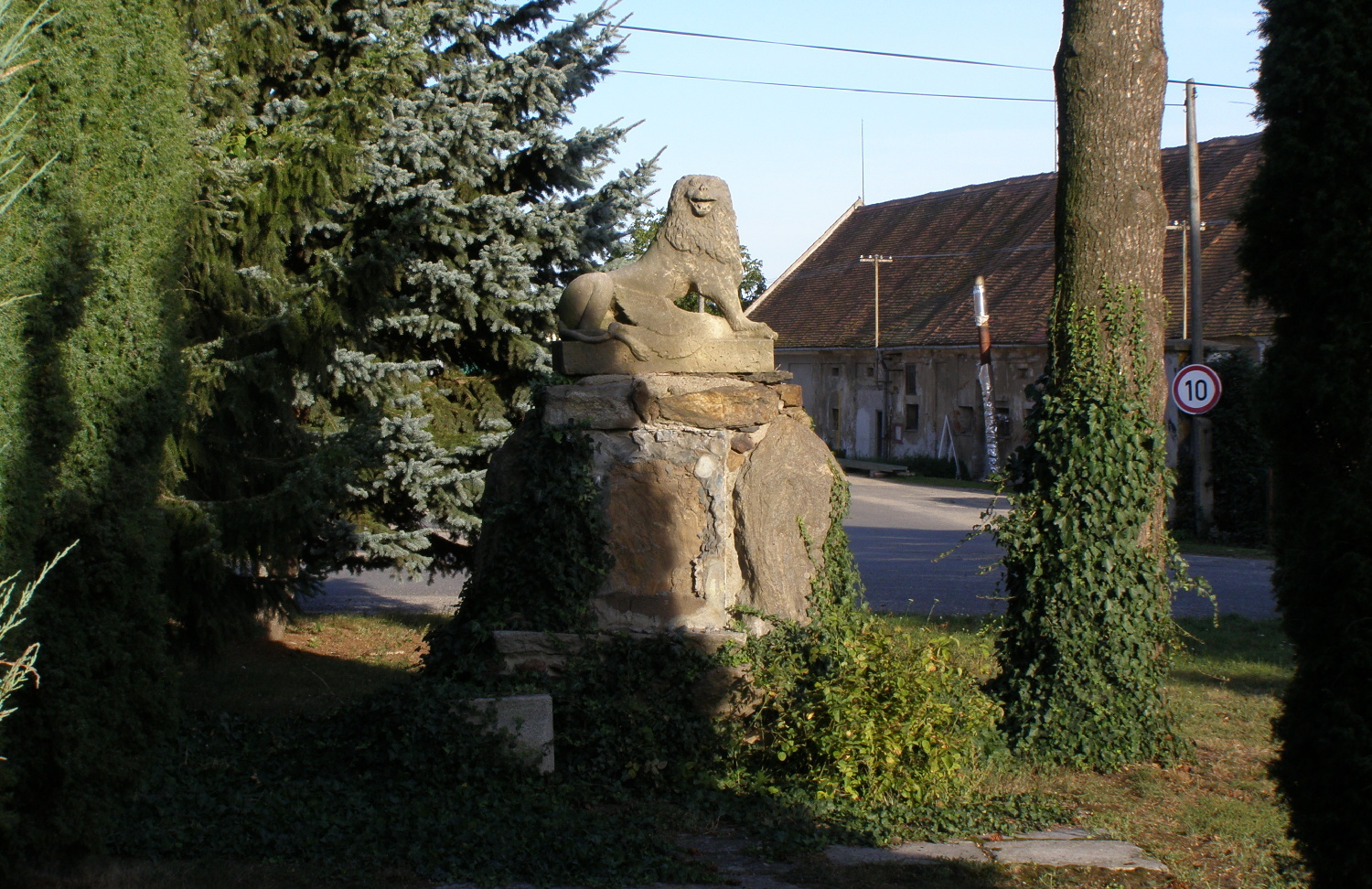
- Centre of Lesonice

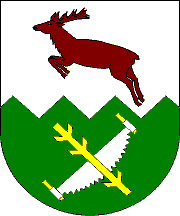
- Flag Coat of arms

- Location in the Czech Republic
- Coordinates: 49°6′28″N 15°45′21″E
- Country: Czech Republic
- Region: Vysočina
- District: Třebíč
- First mentioned: 1190

Area
  - Total: 8.94 km^{2} (3.45 sq mi)
- Elevation: 520 m (1,710 ft)

Population (2026-01-01)
  - Total: 502
  - Density: 56.2/km^{2} (145/sq mi)
- Time zone: UTC+1 (CET)
  - Summer (DST): UTC+2 (CEST)
- Postal code: 675 44
- Website: www.lesonice.cz

Lesonice (German: Lessonitz) is a municipality and village in Třebíč District in the Vysočina Region of the Czech Republic. It has about 500 inhabitants.

Lesonice lies approximately 16 kilometres (10 mi) south-west of Třebíč, 34 km (21 mi) south of Jihlava, and 145 km (90 mi) south-east of Prague.

== Administrative division ==
Lesonice consists of two municipal parts (in brackets population according to the 2021 census):

- Lesonice (452)
- Horní Lažany (25)

== Demographics ==
Historical population
Year	Pop.	±%
1869	562	—
1880	600	+6.8%
1890	578	−3.7%
1900	661	+14.4%
1910	629	−4.8%
1921	648	+3.0%
1930	656	+1.2%
1950	525	−20.0%
1961	581	+10.7%
1970	554	−4.6%
1980	516	−6.9%
1991	526	+1.9%
2001	484	−8.0%
2011	451	−6.8%
2021	477	+5.8%
Source: Censuses
