= Luka nad Jihlavou =

- Market town
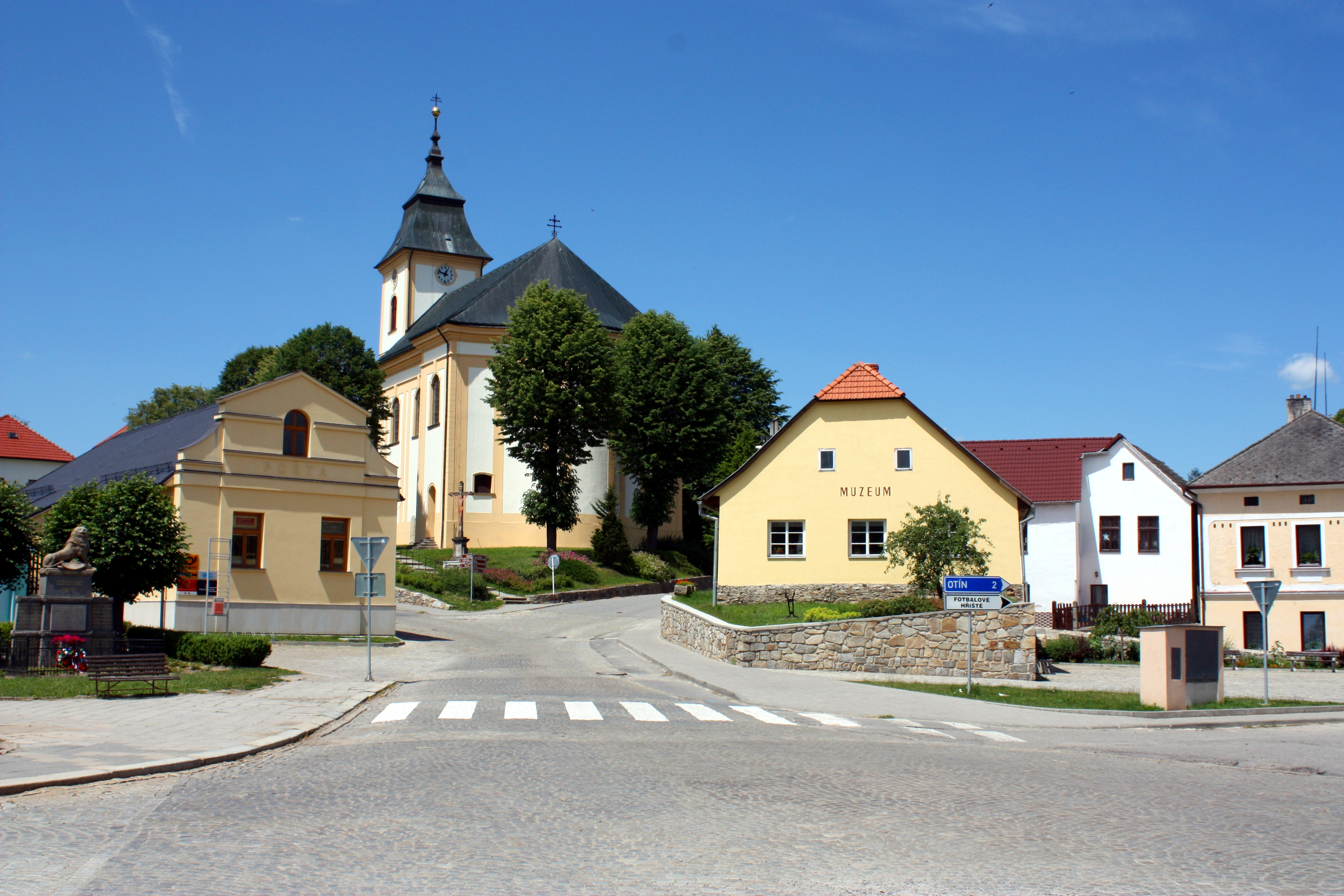
- Church of Saint Bartholomew on the square

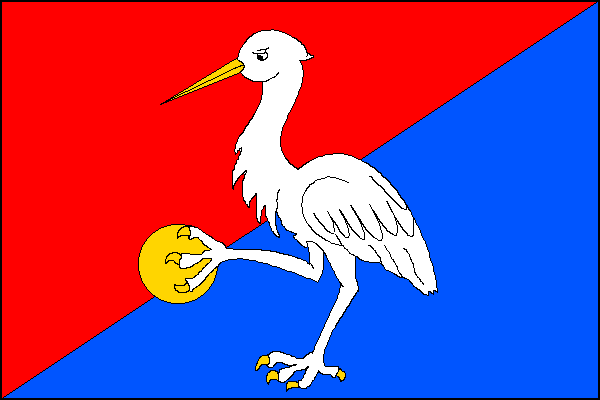
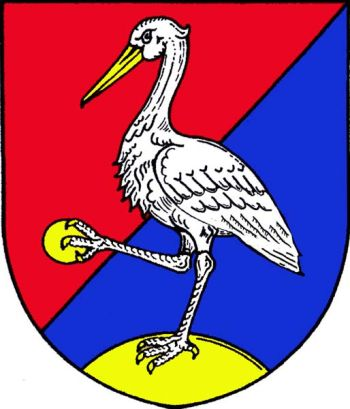
- Flag Coat of arms

- Location in the Czech Republic
- Coordinates: 49°22′27″N 15°42′7″E
- Country: Czech Republic
- Region: Vysočina
- District: Jihlava
- First mentioned: 1378

Area
  - Total: 15.70 km^{2} (6.06 sq mi)
- Elevation: 442 m (1,450 ft)

Population (2026-01-01)
  - Total: 3,184
  - Density: 202.8/km^{2} (525.3/sq mi)
- Time zone: UTC+1 (CET)
  - Summer (DST): UTC+2 (CEST)
- Postal code: 588 22
- Website: www.lukanadjihlavou.cz

Luka nad Jihlavou (Czech pronunciation: [ˈluka ˈnad jɪɦlavou]; German: Wiese an der Igel) is a market town in Jihlava District in the Vysočina Region of the Czech Republic. It has about 3,200 inhabitants.

== Administrative division ==
Luka nad Jihlavou consists of four municipal parts (in brackets population according to the 2021 census):

- Luka nad Jihlavou (2,812)
- Otín (87)
- Předboř (29)
- Svatoslav (30)

== Etymology ==
Until the 1880s, Luka nad Jihlavou was named Louka (lit. 'meadow' in Czech). From the 1880s to the 1920s, it was called Luka. Since the 1920s, it has been known as Luka nad Jihlavou ('meadows upon Jihlava').

== Geography ==
Luka nad Jihlavou is located about 8 kilometres (5 mi) east of Jihlava. It lies on the border between the Křižanov Highlands and Upper Sázava Hills. The highest point is the hill Babylon at 564 m (1,850 ft) above sea level. The Jihlava River flows through the market town.

== History ==
The first written mention of Luka nad Jihlavou is from 1378. The local Baroque castle was built in 1739–1747. In 1755 Maria Theresa promoted the village to a market town. Until 1768, Luka often changed hands. From 1768, it was continuously owned by the Widmann family.

== Demographics ==
Historical population

Year	Pop.	±%
1869	1,347	—
1880	1,387	+3.0%
1890	1,611	+16.1%
1900	1,802	+11.9%
1910	2,007	+11.4%

Year	Pop.	±%
1921	2,053	+2.3%
1930	2,274	+10.8%
1950	2,125	−6.6%
1961	2,269	+6.8%
1970	2,290	+0.9%

Year	Pop.	±%
1980	2,376	+3.8%
1991	2,335	−1.7%
2001	2,480	+6.2%
2011	2,663	+7.4%
2021	2,958	+11.1%

Source: Censuses

== Transport ==
Luka nad Jihlavou is located on the railway line Jihlava–Třebíč.

== Sights ==
The main landmark of Luka nad Jihlavou is the Church of Saint Bartholomew. It was built in the late Baroque style in 1755–1763, on the site of the former Romanesque church. The tower remained original, dating back to 1200. The upper part of the tower was rebuilt in 1804, however, the lower part has been preserved to this day.

== Twin towns – sister cities ==
Luka nad Jihlavou is twinned with:

- Forst, Germany
- Reutigen, Switzerland
