= Maleč =

- Municipality
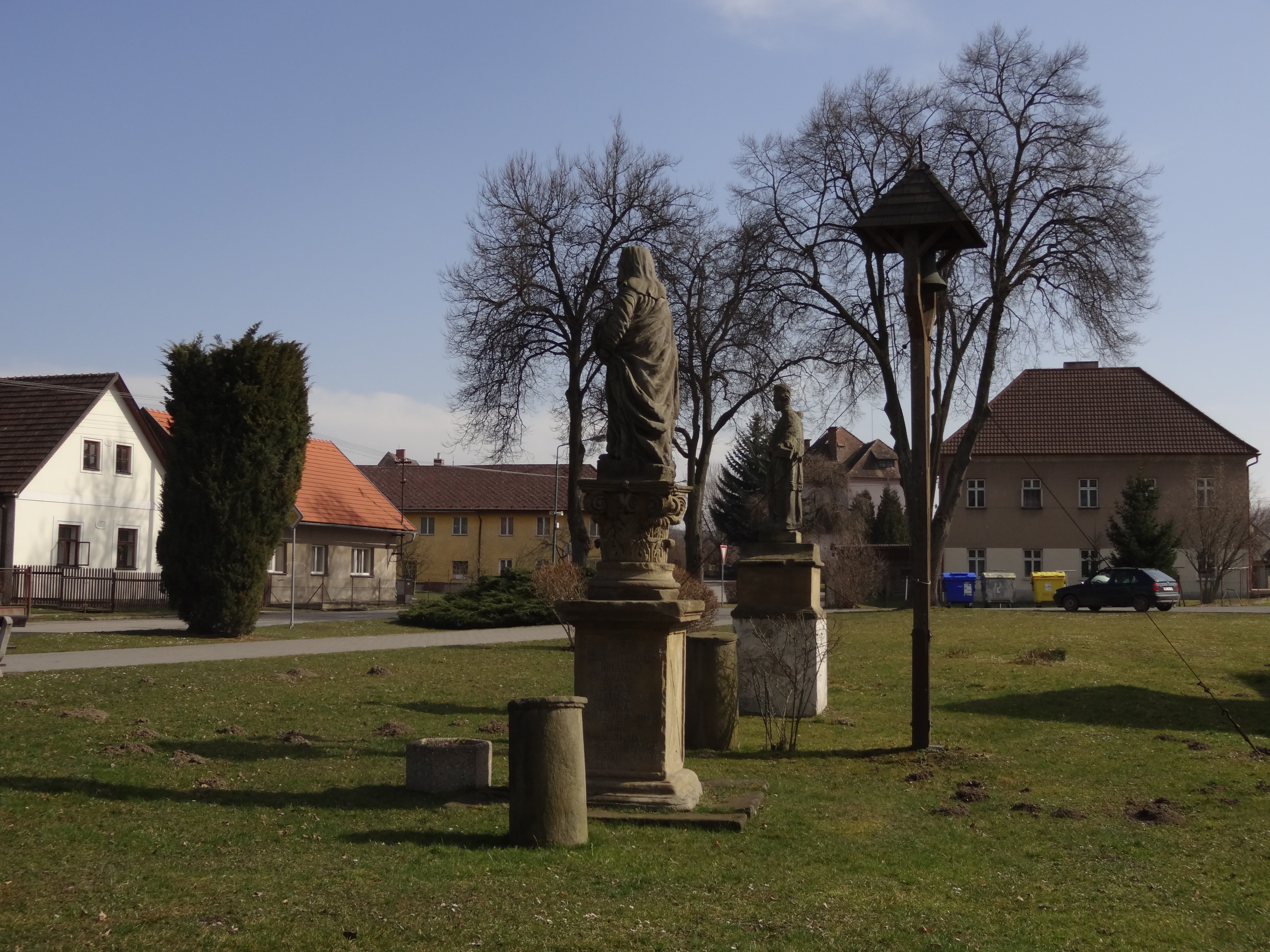
- Centre of Maleč

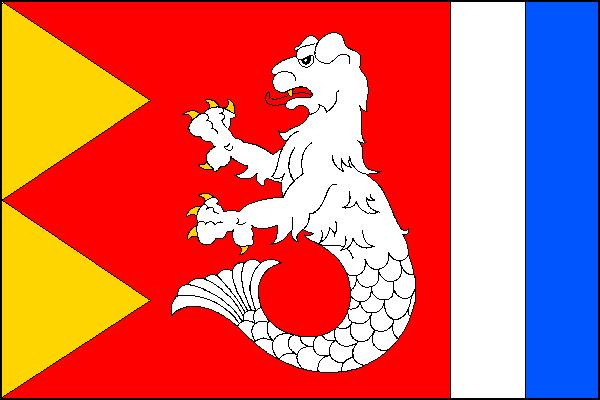
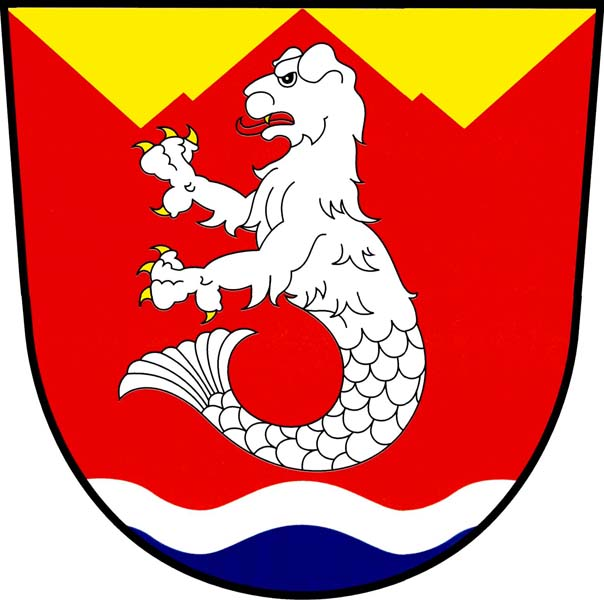
- Flag Coat of arms

- Location in the Czech Republic
- Coordinates: 49°46′19″N 15°40′37″E
- Country: Czech Republic
- Region: Vysočina
- District: Havlíčkův Brod
- First mentioned: 1278

Area
  - Total: 12.10 km^{2} (4.67 sq mi)
- Elevation: 392 m (1,286 ft)

Population (2026-01-01)
  - Total: 612
  - Density: 50.6/km^{2} (131/sq mi)
- Time zone: UTC+1 (CET)
  - Summer (DST): UTC+2 (CEST)
- Postal codes: 582 76, 583 01
- Website: www.malec.cz

Maleč is a municipality and village in Havlíčkův Brod District in the Vysočina Region of the Czech Republic. It has about 600 inhabitants.

Maleč lies approximately 20 kilometres (12 mi) north of Havlíčkův Brod, 42 km (26 mi) north of Jihlava, and 97 km (60 mi) east of Prague.

== Administrative division ==
Maleč consists of seven municipal parts (in brackets population according to the 2021 census):

- Maleč (425)
- Blatnice (40)
- Dolní Lhotka (7)
- Horní Lhotka (18)
- Hranice (55)
- Jeníkovec (26)
- Předboř (33)

== Demographics ==
Historical population
Year	Pop.	±%
1869	1,052	—
1880	1,165	+10.7%
1890	1,059	−9.1%
1900	1,069	+0.9%
1910	1,115	+4.3%
1921	1,182	+6.0%
1930	991	−16.2%
1950	752	−24.1%
1961	780	+3.7%
1970	733	−6.0%
1980	733	+0.0%
1991	724	−1.2%
2001	698	−3.6%
2011	652	−6.6%
2021	604	−7.4%
Source: Censuses
