= Loučky =

- Municipality
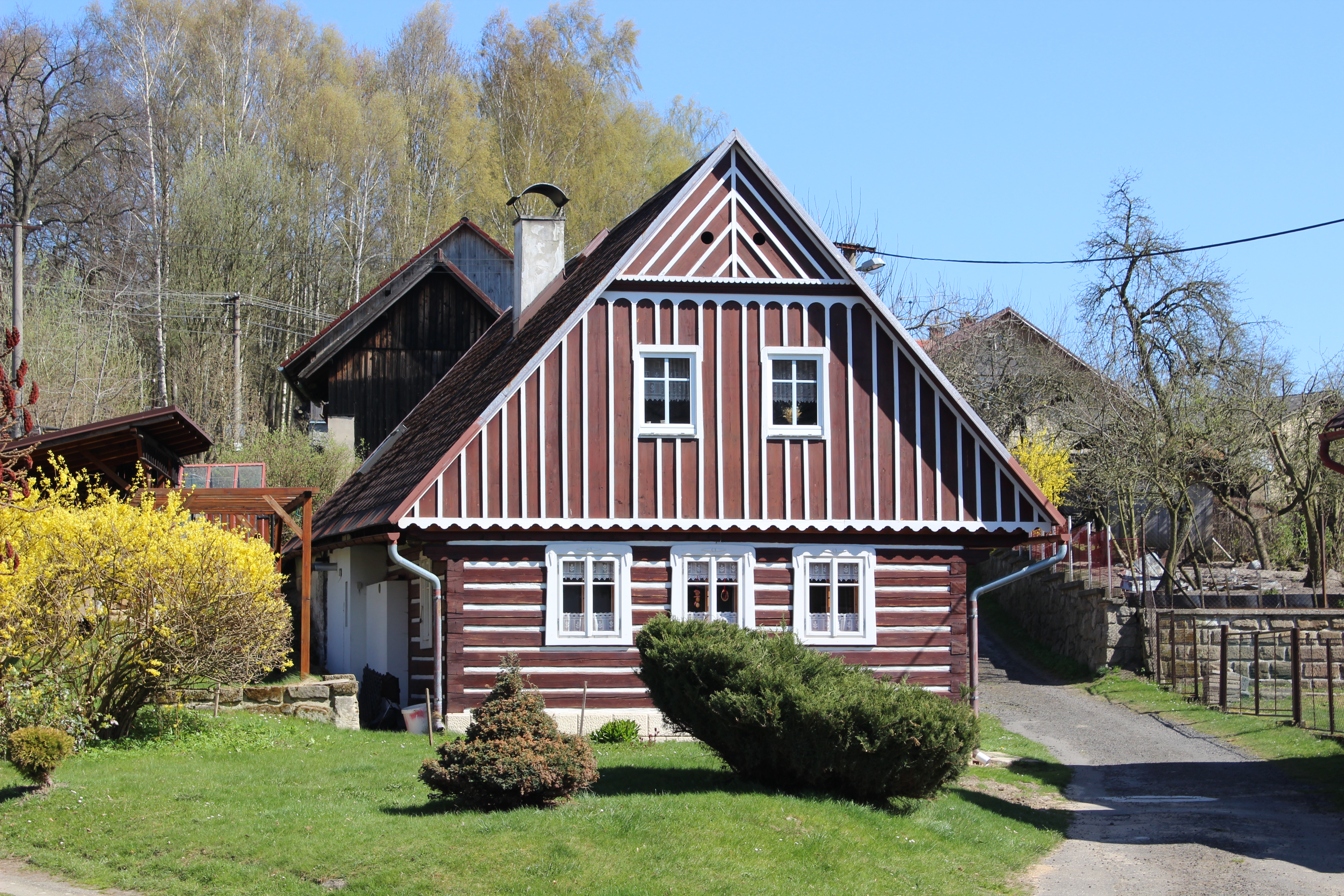
- House No. 11

- Flag Coat of arms

- Location in the Czech Republic
- Coordinates: 50°37′3″N 15°13′7″E
- Country: Czech Republic
- Region: Liberec
- District: Semily
- First mentioned: 1499

Area
  - Total: 1.65 km^{2} (0.64 sq mi)
- Elevation: 424 m (1,391 ft)

Population (2026-01-01)
  - Total: 155
  - Density: 93.9/km^{2} (243/sq mi)
- Time zone: UTC+1 (CET)
  - Summer (DST): UTC+2 (CEST)
- Postal code: 511 01
- Website: www.loucky.info

Loučky is a municipality and village in Semily District in the Liberec Region of the Czech Republic. It has about 200 inhabitants.

== Demographics ==
Historical population
Year	Pop.	±%
1869	359	—
1880	405	+12.8%
1890	417	+3.0%
1900	457	+9.6%
1910	412	−9.8%
1921	380	−7.8%
1930	296	−22.1%
1950	193	−34.8%
1961	198	+2.6%
1970	184	−7.1%
1980	172	−6.5%
1991	151	−12.2%
2001	162	+7.3%
2011	152	−6.2%
2021	170	+11.8%
Source: Censuses
