= Klokočov (Havlíčkův Brod District) =

- Municipality
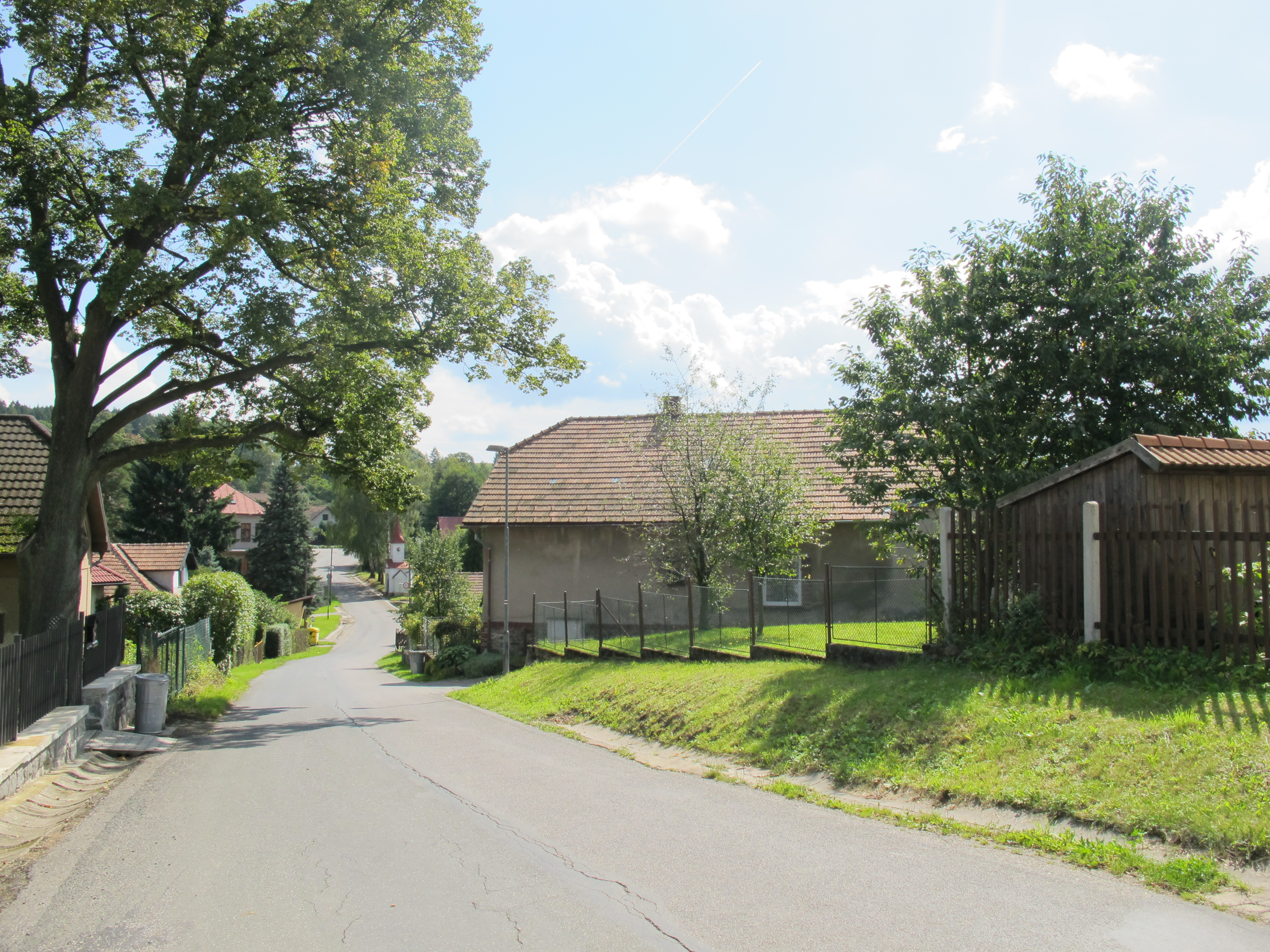
- Main street

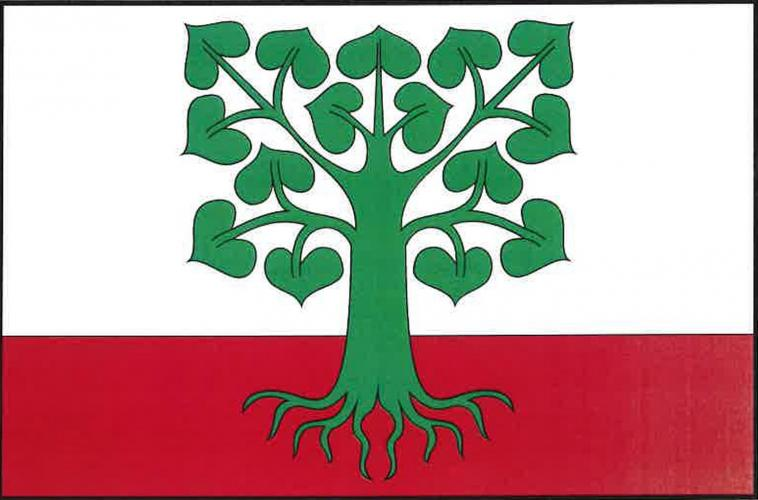
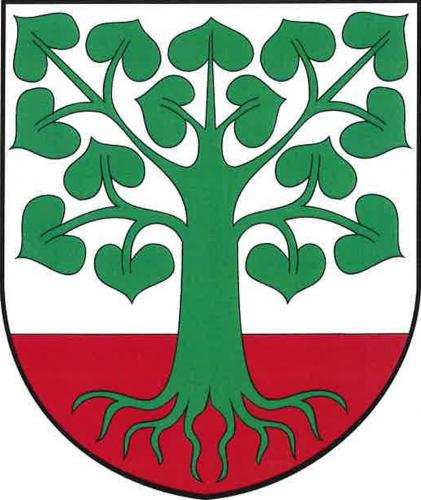
- Flag Coat of arms

- Location in the Czech Republic
- Coordinates: 49°48′12″N 15°40′24″E
- Country: Czech Republic
- Region: Vysočina
- District: Havlíčkův Brod
- First mentioned: 1546

Area
  - Total: 2.22 km^{2} (0.86 sq mi)
- Elevation: 535 m (1,755 ft)

Population (2026-01-01)
  - Total: 112
  - Density: 50.5/km^{2} (131/sq mi)
- Time zone: UTC+1 (CET)
  - Summer (DST): UTC+2 (CEST)
- Postal code: 583 01
- Website: www.klokocov.eu

Klokočov is a municipality and village in Havlíčkův Brod District in the Vysočina Region of the Czech Republic. It has about 100 inhabitants.

Klokočov lies approximately 23 kilometres (14 mi) north of Havlíčkův Brod, 46 km (29 mi) north of Jihlava, and 96 km (60 mi) east of Prague.

== Administrative division ==
Klokočov consists of two municipal parts (in brackets population according to the 2021 census):

- Klokočov (77)
- Klokočovská Lhotka (36)

== Demographics ==
Historical population
| Year | Pop. | ±% |
|---|---|---|
| 1869 | 505 | — |
| 1880 | 482 | −4.6% |
| 1890 | 440 | −8.7% |
| 1900 | 514 | +16.8% |
| 1910 | 558 | +8.6% |
| 1921 | 575 | +3.0% |
| 1930 | 433 | −24.7% |
| 1950 | 309 | −28.6% |
| 1961 | 304 | −1.6% |
| 1970 | 252 | −17.1% |
| 1980 | 181 | −28.2% |
| 1991 | 128 | −29.3% |
| 2001 | 140 | +9.4% |
| 2011 | 114 | −18.6% |
| 2021 | 113 | −0.9% |
Source: Censuses
