= Budeč (Žďár nad Sázavou District) =

- Municipality
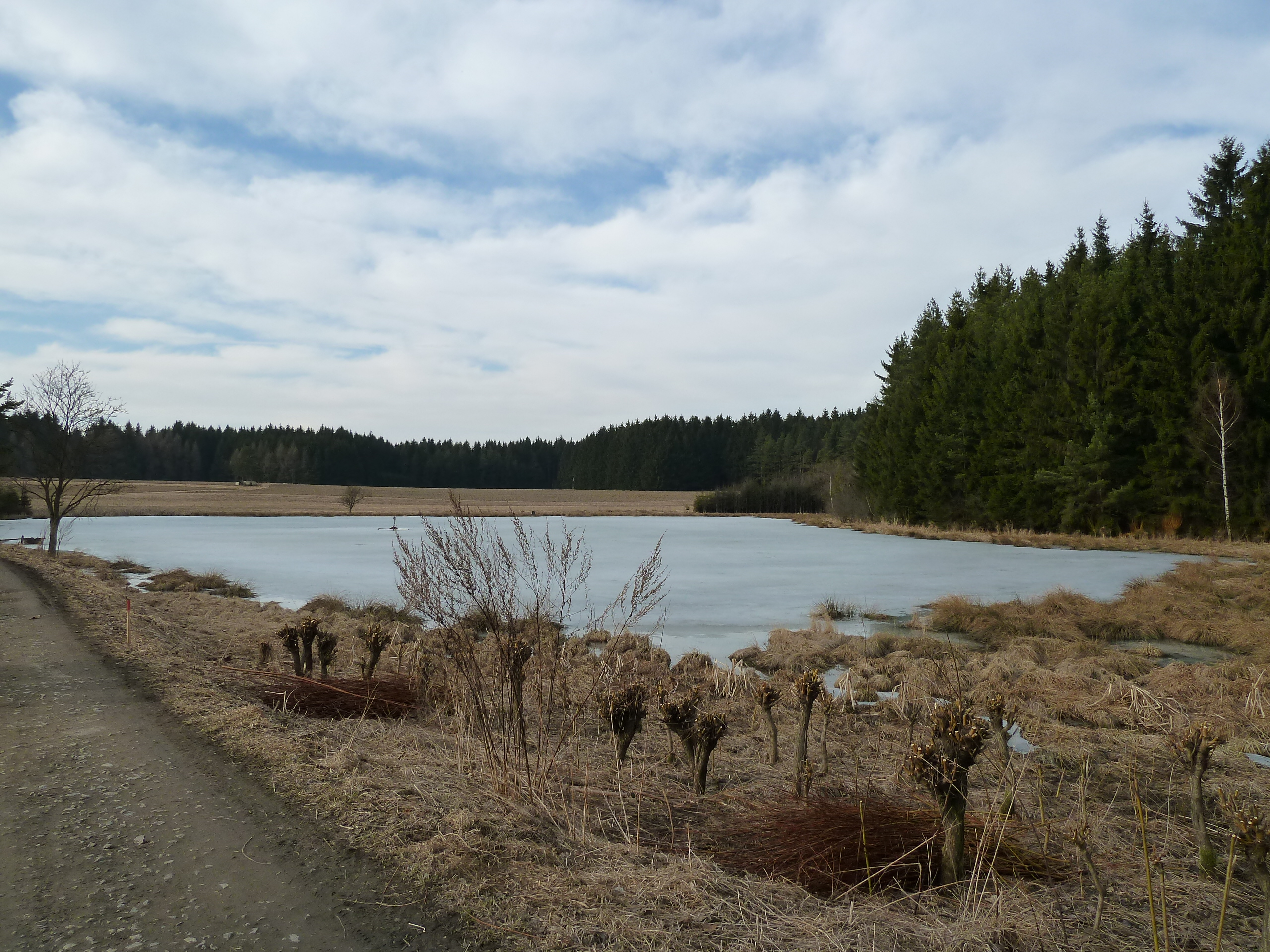
- Plaček pond

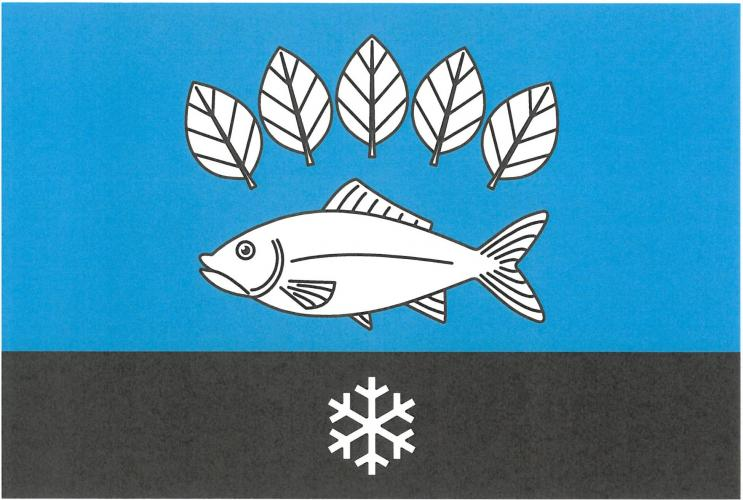
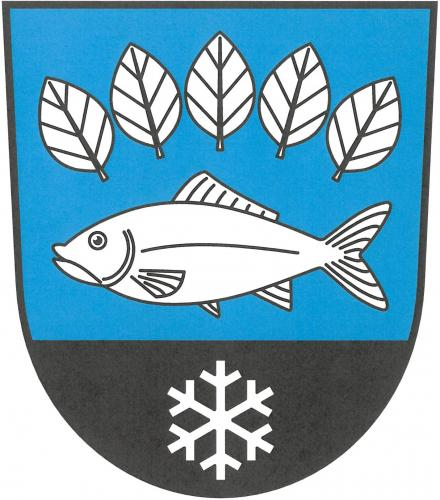
- Flag Coat of arms

- Location in the Czech Republic
- Coordinates: 49°32′11″N 15°54′44″E
- Country: Czech Republic
- Region: Vysočina
- District: Žďár nad Sázavou
- First mentioned: 1377

Area
  - Total: 5.39 km^{2} (2.08 sq mi)
- Elevation: 580 m (1,900 ft)

Population (2026-01-01)
  - Total: 180
  - Density: 33/km^{2} (86/sq mi)
- Time zone: UTC+1 (CET)
  - Summer (DST): UTC+2 (CEST)
- Postal code: 592 14
- Website: www.budec.cz

Budeč is a municipality and village in Žďár nad Sázavou District in the Vysočina Region of the Czech Republic. It has about 200 inhabitants.

Budeč lies approximately 4 kilometres (2 mi) south-west of Žďár nad Sázavou, 29 km (18 mi) north-east of Jihlava, and 124 km (77 mi) south-east of Prague.

== Demographics ==
Historical population
| Year | Pop. | ±% |
|---|---|---|
| 1869 | 257 | — |
| 1880 | 268 | +4.3% |
| 1890 | 242 | −9.7% |
| 1900 | 256 | +5.8% |
| 1910 | 263 | +2.7% |
| 1921 | 270 | +2.7% |
| 1930 | 224 | −17.0% |
| 1950 | 197 | −12.1% |
| 1961 | 182 | −7.6% |
| 1970 | 189 | +3.8% |
| 1980 | 183 | −3.2% |
| 1991 | 158 | −13.7% |
| 2001 | 180 | +13.9% |
| 2011 | 174 | −3.3% |
| 2021 | 166 | −4.6% |
Source: Censuses
