= Nejepín =

- Municipality
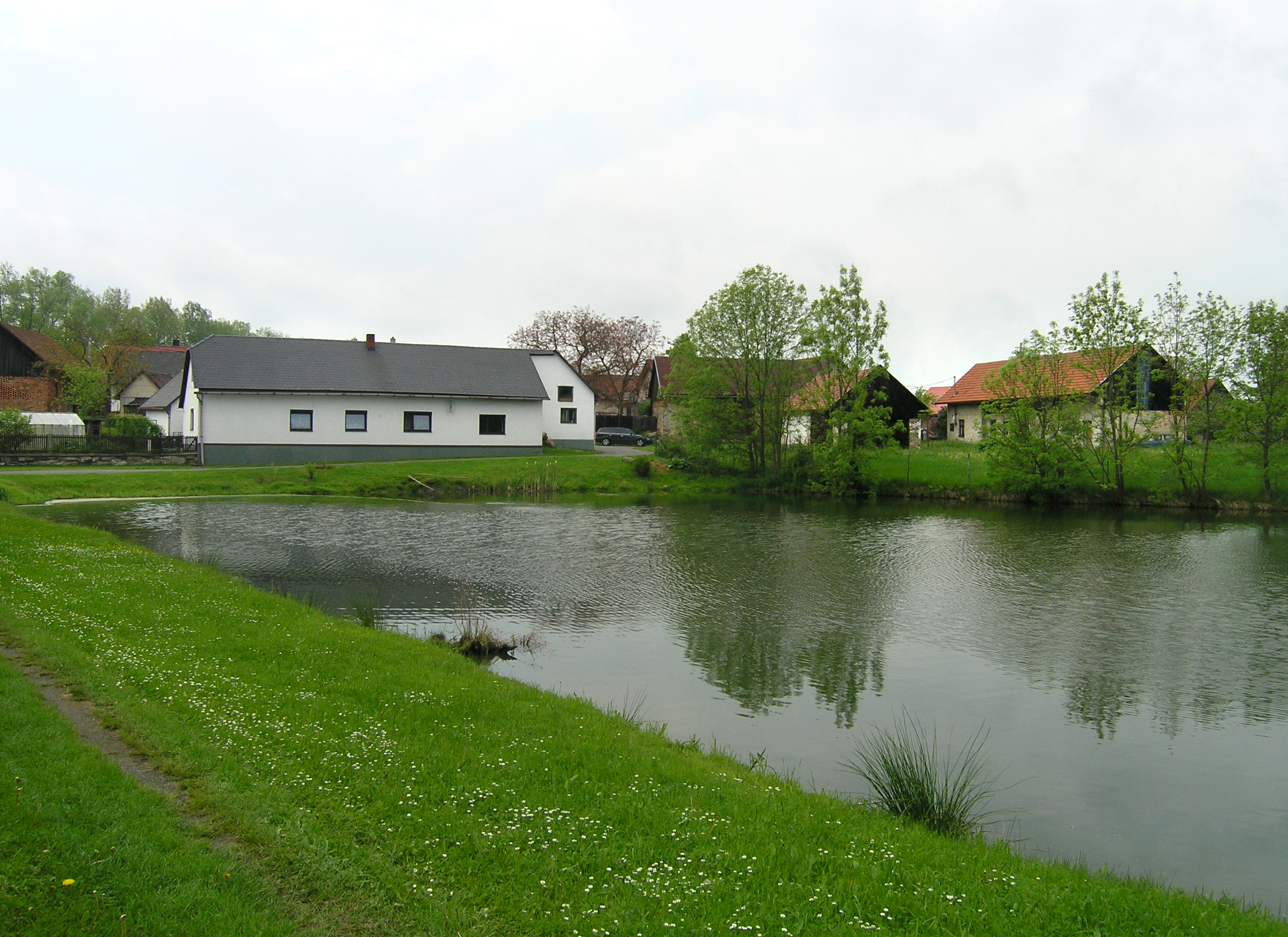
- Pivovarský Pond

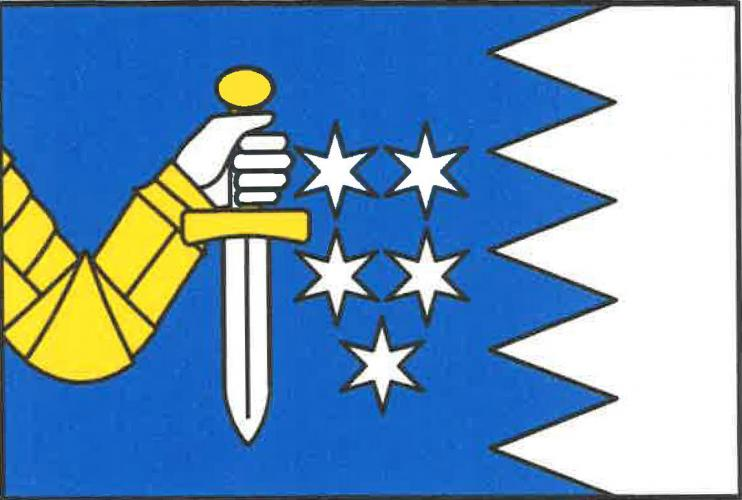
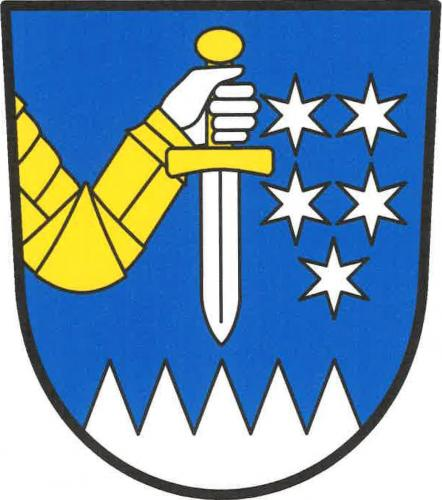
- Flag Coat of arms

- Location in the Czech Republic
- Coordinates: 49°44′40″N 15°36′2″E
- Country: Czech Republic
- Region: Vysočina
- District: Havlíčkův Brod
- First mentioned: 1488

Area
  - Total: 3.79 km^{2} (1.46 sq mi)
- Elevation: 524 m (1,719 ft)

Population (2026-01-01)
  - Total: 101
  - Density: 26.6/km^{2} (69.0/sq mi)
- Time zone: UTC+1 (CET)
  - Summer (DST): UTC+2 (CEST)
- Postal code: 583 01
- Website: www.nejepin.cz

Nejepín is a municipality and village in Havlíčkův Brod District in the Vysočina Region of the Czech Republic. It has about 100 inhabitants.

Nejepín lies approximately 15 kilometres (9 mi) north of Havlíčkův Brod, 38 km (24 mi) north of Jihlava, and 94 km (58 mi) south-east of Prague.

== Demographics ==
Historical population
Year	Pop.	±%
1869	276	—
1880	277	+0.4%
1890	253	−8.7%
1900	222	−12.3%
1910	219	−1.4%
1921	235	+7.3%
1930	206	−12.3%
1950	153	−25.7%
1961	160	+4.6%
1970	157	−1.9%
1980	105	−33.1%
1991	84	−20.0%
2001	64	−23.8%
2011	57	−10.9%
2021	66	+15.8%
Source: Censuses
