= Bojiště =

- Municipality
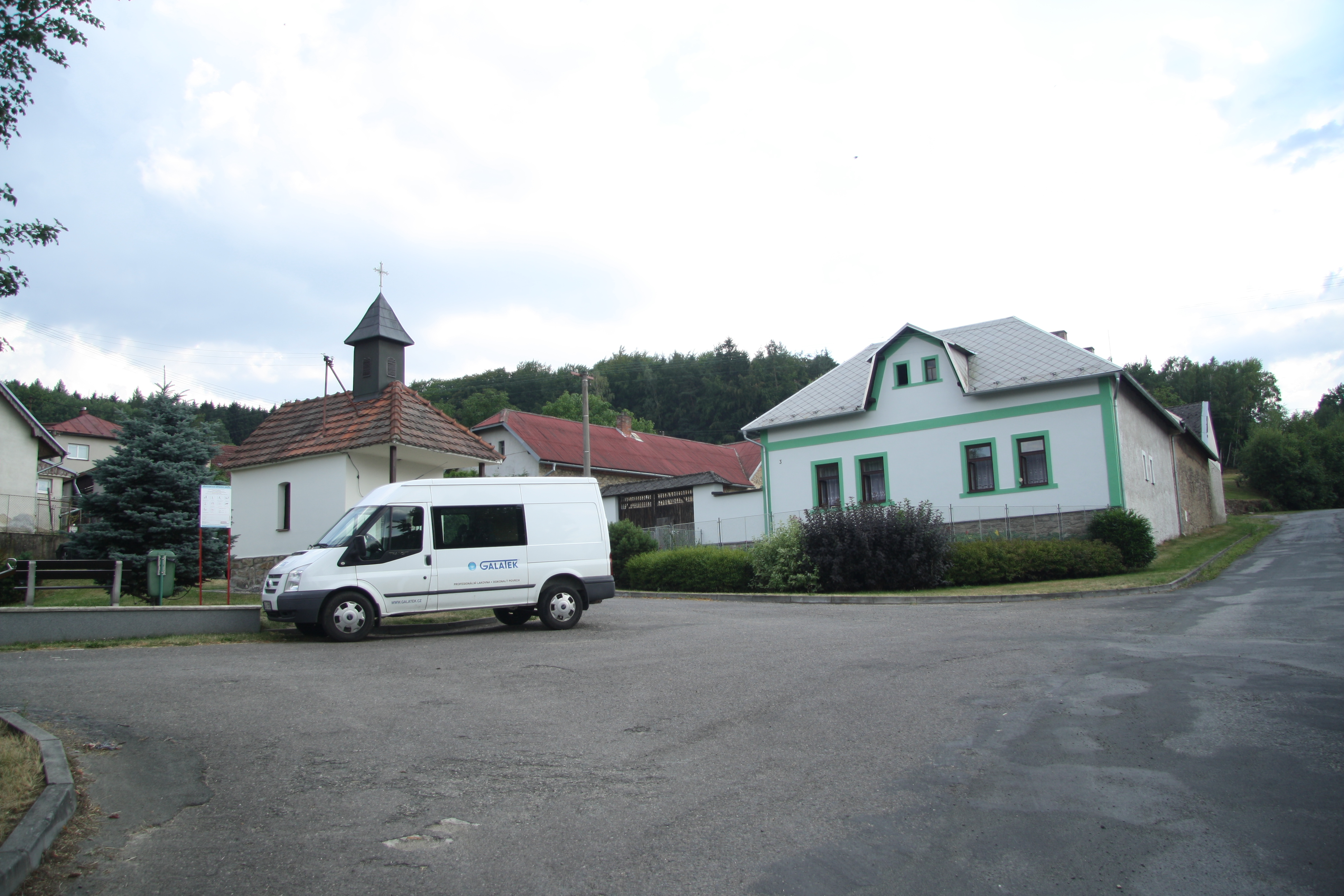
- Mstislavice, a part of Bojiště

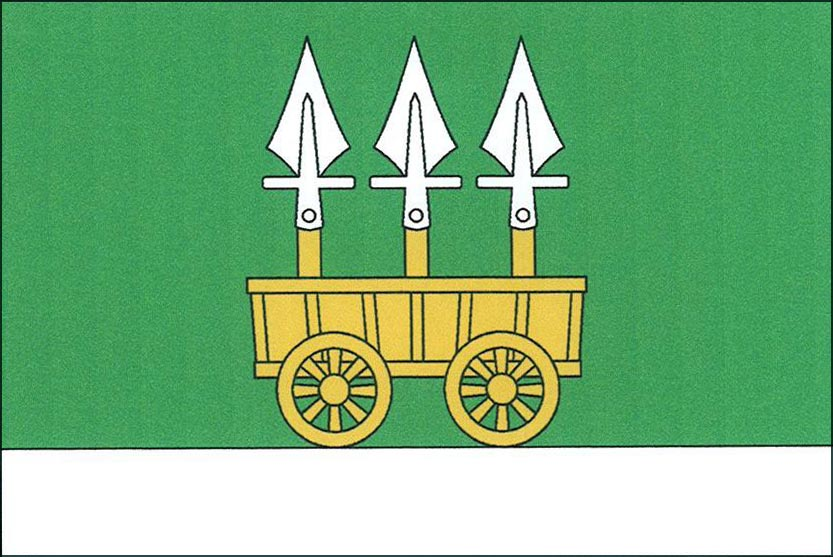
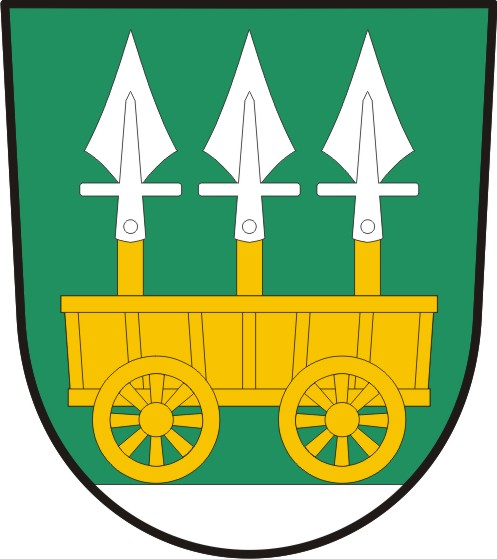
- Flag Coat of arms

- Location in the Czech Republic
- Coordinates: 49°40′4″N 15°17′13″E
- Country: Czech Republic
- Region: Vysočina
- District: Havlíčkův Brod
- First mentioned: 1560

Area
  - Total: 7.26 km^{2} (2.80 sq mi)
- Elevation: 474 m (1,555 ft)

Population (2026-01-01)
  - Total: 294
  - Density: 40.5/km^{2} (105/sq mi)
- Time zone: UTC+1 (CET)
  - Summer (DST): UTC+2 (CEST)
- Postal code: 584 01
- Website: www.obecbojiste.cz

Bojiště (Czech pronunciation: [ˈbojɪʃcɛ]) is a municipality and village in Havlíčkův Brod District in the Vysočina Region of the Czech Republic. It has about 300 inhabitants.

Bojiště lies approximately 23 kilometres (14 mi) west of Havlíčkův Brod, 38 km (24 mi) north-west of Jihlava, and 78 km (48 mi) south-east of Prague.

== Administrative division ==
Bojiště consists of three municipal parts (in brackets population according to the 2021 census):

- Bojiště (174)
- Mstislavice (62)
- Veliká (54)

== Demographics ==
Historical population
Year	Pop.	±%
1869	534	—
1880	508	−4.9%
1890	529	+4.1%
1900	469	−11.3%
1910	443	−5.5%
1921	402	−9.3%
1930	410	+2.0%
1950	430	+4.9%
1961	294	−31.6%
1970	308	+4.8%
1980	252	−18.2%
1991	229	−9.1%
2001	253	+10.5%
2011	268	+5.9%
2021	290	+8.2%
Source: Censuses
