= Služátky =

- Municipality
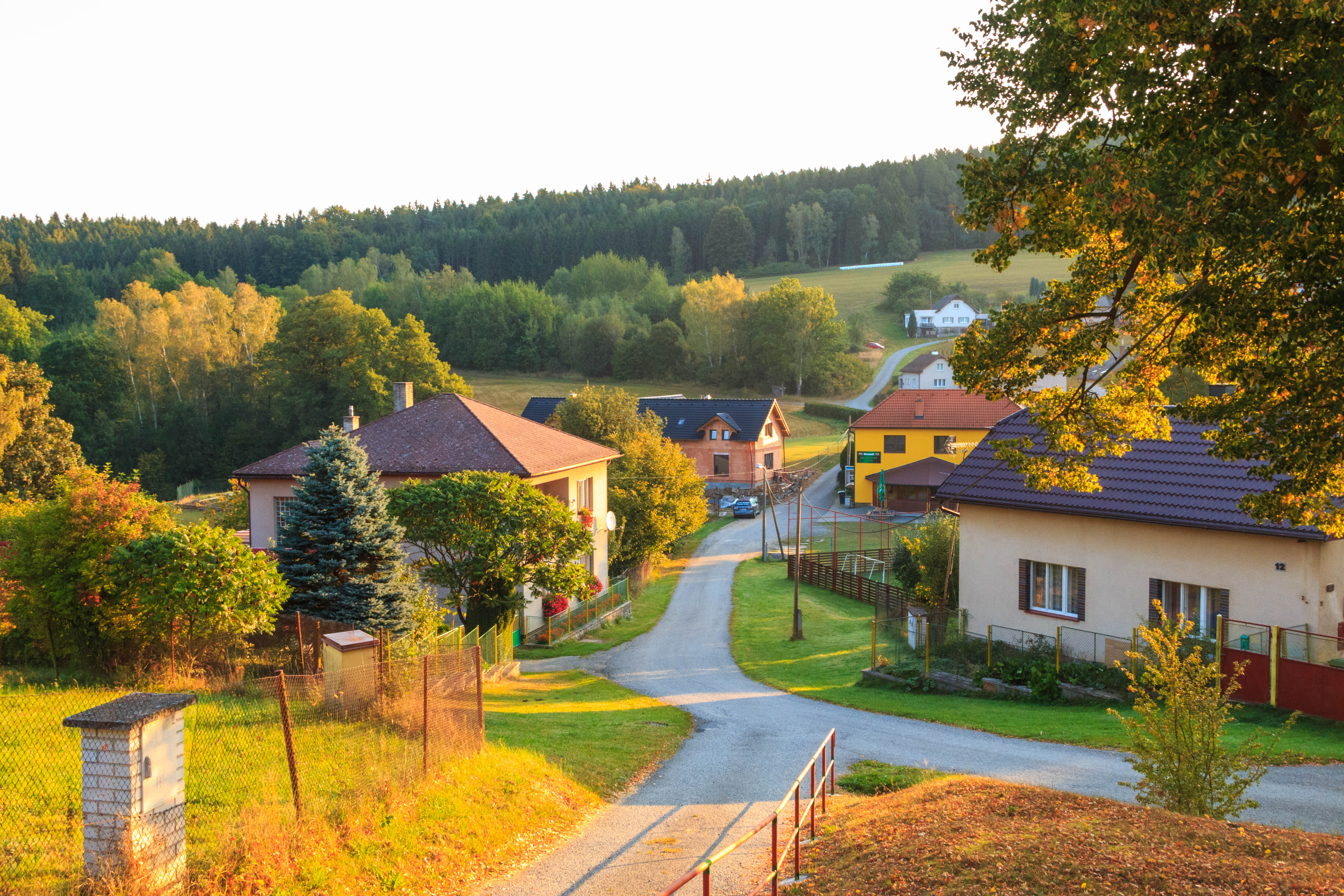
- Side street

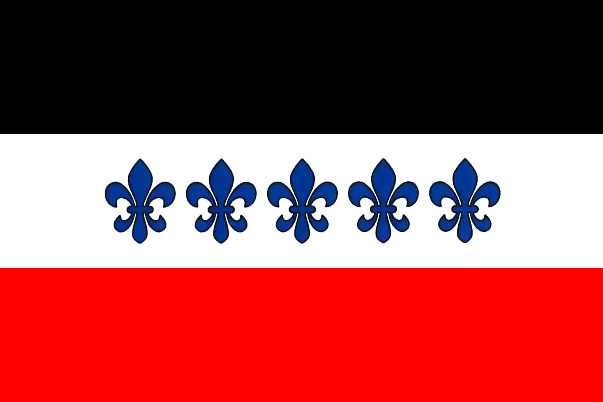
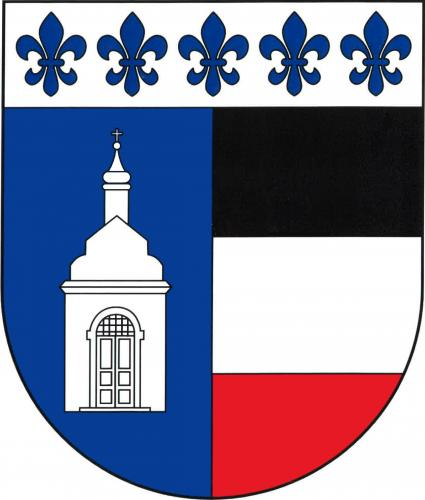
- Flag Coat of arms

- Location in the Czech Republic
- Coordinates: 49°41′6″N 15°25′53″E
- Country: Czech Republic
- Region: Vysočina
- District: Havlíčkův Brod
- First mentioned: 1591

Area
  - Total: 3.07 km^{2} (1.19 sq mi)
- Elevation: 467 m (1,532 ft)

Population (2026-01-01)
  - Total: 160
  - Density: 52/km^{2} (130/sq mi)
- Time zone: UTC+1 (CET)
  - Summer (DST): UTC+2 (CEST)
- Postal code: 582 91
- Website: www.sluzatky.cz

Služátky is a municipality and village in Havlíčkův Brod District in the Vysočina Region of the Czech Republic. It has about 200 inhabitants.

Služátky lies approximately 14 kilometres (9 mi) north-west of Havlíčkův Brod, 35 km (22 mi) north of Jihlava, and 86 km (53 mi) south-east of Prague.

== Demographics ==
Historical population
Year	Pop.	±%
1869	93	—
1880	130	+39.8%
1890	138	+6.2%
1900	146	+5.8%
1910	182	+24.7%
1921	175	−3.8%
1930	180	+2.9%
1950	213	+18.3%
1961	121	−43.2%
1970	161	+33.1%
1980	147	−8.7%
1991	127	−13.6%
2001	142	+11.8%
2011	155	+9.2%
2021	142	−8.4%
Source: Censuses
