= Petr Zelenka =

Petr Zelenka may refer to:

- Petr Zelenka (director)
- Petr Zelenka (serial killer)
