= Sázavka =

- Municipality
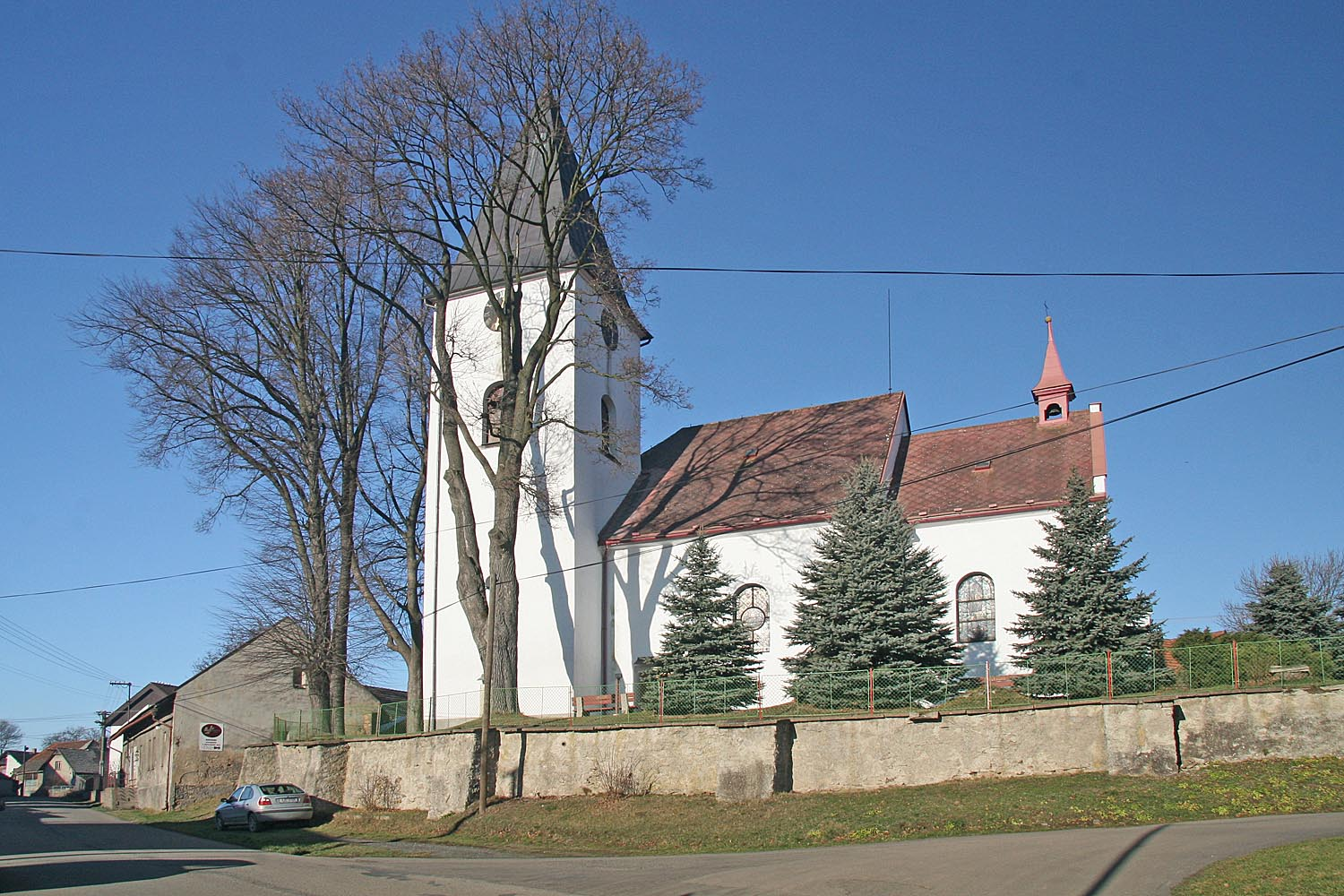
- Church of Saint John the Baptist

- Location in the Czech Republic
- Coordinates: 49°44′4″N 15°24′41″E
- Country: Czech Republic
- Region: Vysočina
- District: Havlíčkův Brod
- First mentioned: 1226

Area
  - Total: 11.01 km^{2} (4.25 sq mi)
- Elevation: 497 m (1,631 ft)

Population (2026-01-01)
  - Total: 324
  - Density: 29.4/km^{2} (76.2/sq mi)
- Time zone: UTC+1 (CET)
  - Summer (DST): UTC+2 (CEST)
- Postal code: 582 44
- Website: www.obecsazavka.cz

Sázavka is a municipality and village in Havlíčkův Brod District in the Vysočina Region of the Czech Republic. It has about 300 inhabitants.

Sázavka lies approximately 19 kilometres (12 mi) north-west of Havlíčkův Brod, 40 km (25 mi) north of Jihlava, and 82 km (51 mi) south-east of Prague.

== Demographics ==
Historical population
Year	Pop.	±%
1869	577	—
1880	554	−4.0%
1890	600	+8.3%
1900	576	−4.0%
1910	602	+4.5%
1921	571	−5.1%
1930	576	+0.9%
1950	443	−23.1%
1961	453	+2.3%
1970	418	−7.7%
1980	381	−8.9%
1991	335	−12.1%
2001	311	−7.2%
2011	316	+1.6%
2021	309	−2.2%
Source: Censuses
