= Kojetín (Havlíčkův Brod District) =

- Municipality
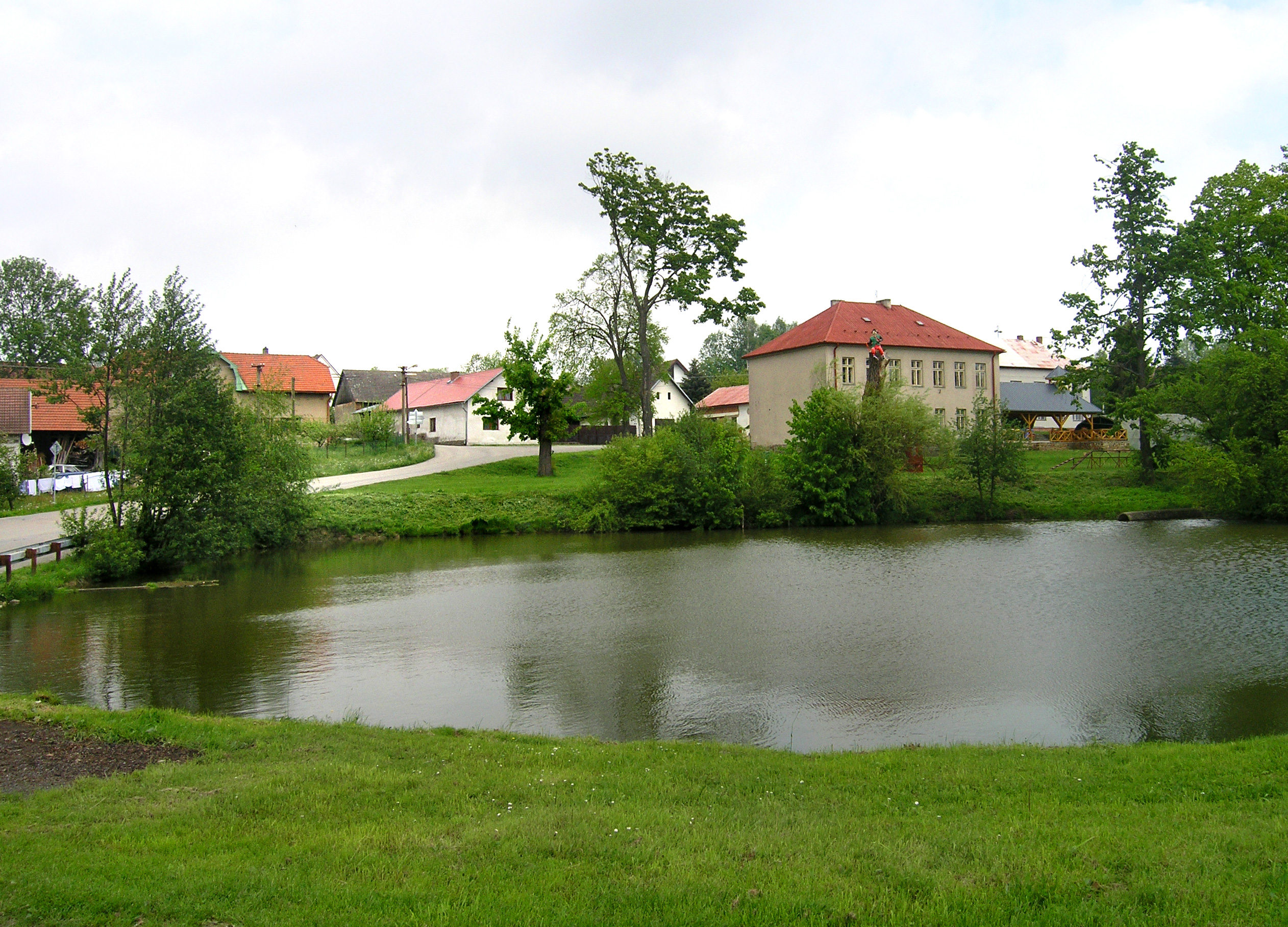
- Centre of Kojetín

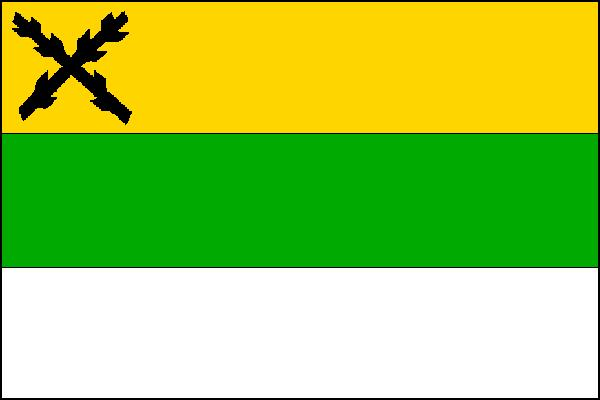
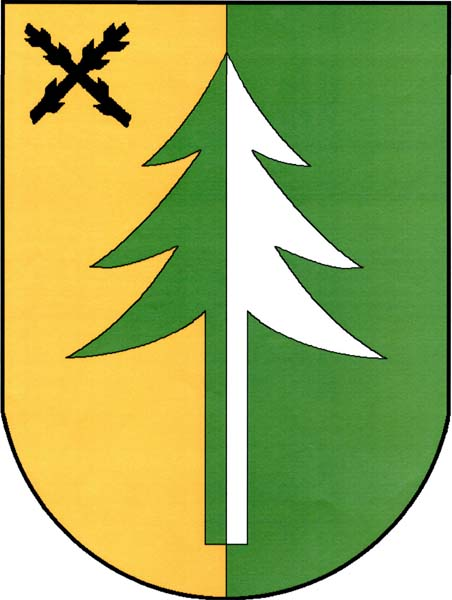
- Flag Coat of arms

- Location in the Czech Republic
- Coordinates: 49°39′26″N 15°39′29″E
- Country: Czech Republic
- Region: Vysočina
- District: Havlíčkův Brod
- First mentioned: 1351

Area
  - Total: 7.98 km^{2} (3.08 sq mi)
- Elevation: 523 m (1,716 ft)

Population (2026-01-01)
  - Total: 194
  - Density: 24.3/km^{2} (63.0/sq mi)
- Time zone: UTC+1 (CET)
  - Summer (DST): UTC+2 (CEST)
- Postal code: 580 01
- Website: www.kojetin-hb.cz

Kojetín is a municipality and village in Havlíčkův Brod District in the Vysočina Region of the Czech Republic. It has about 200 inhabitants.

Kojetín lies approximately 8 kilometres (5 mi) north-east of Havlíčkův Brod, 30 km (19 mi) north of Jihlava, and 101 km (63 mi) south-east of Prague.

== Demographics ==
Historical population
Year	Pop.	±%
1869	448	—
1880	483	+7.8%
1890	475	−1.7%
1900	410	−13.7%
1910	384	−6.3%
1921	410	+6.8%
1930	401	−2.2%
1950	285	−28.9%
1961	252	−11.6%
1970	230	−8.7%
1980	215	−6.5%
1991	175	−18.6%
2001	163	−6.9%
2011	154	−5.5%
2021	157	+1.9%
Source: Censuses
