= Kochánov =

- Municipality
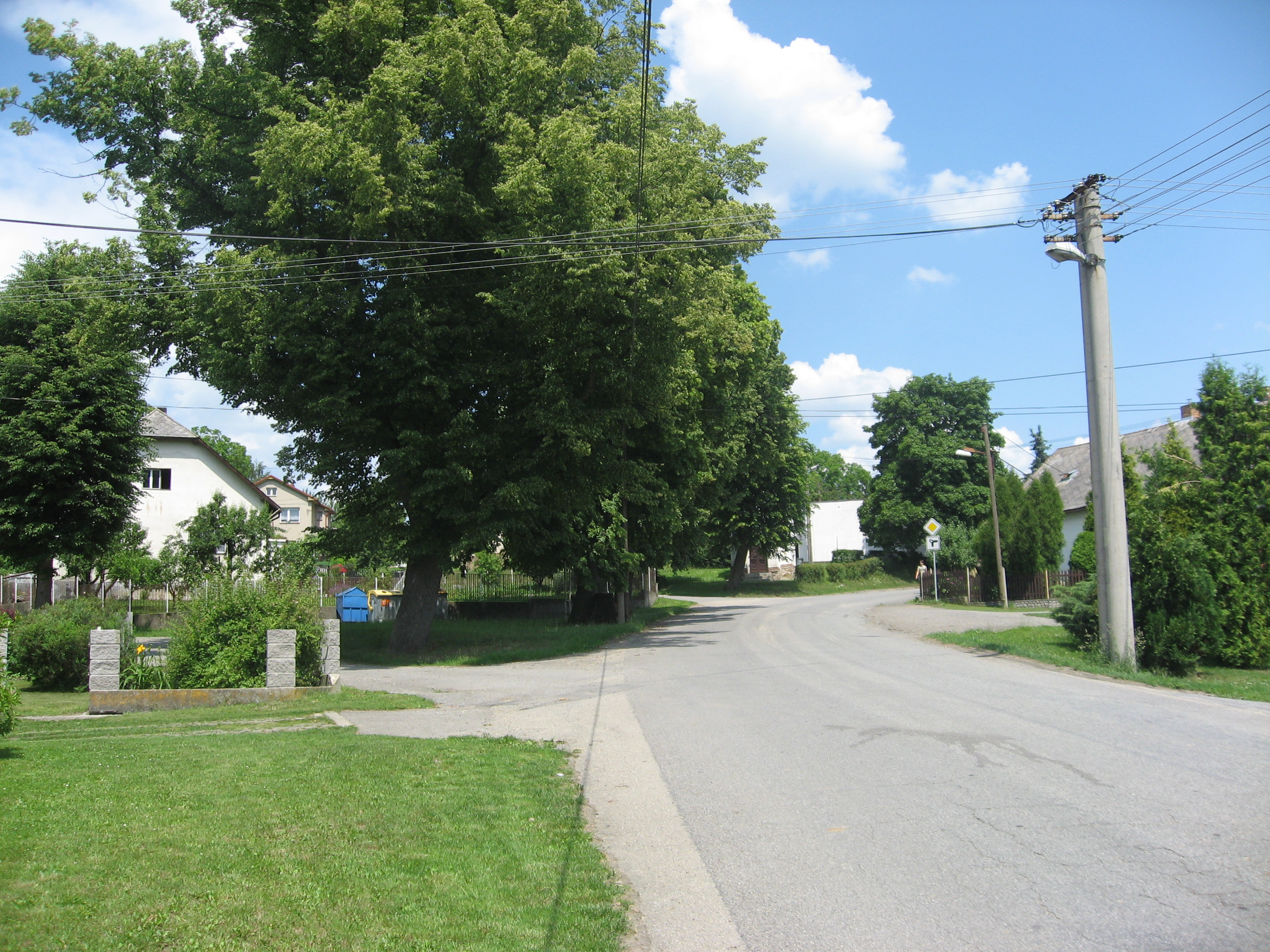
- Centre of Kochánov

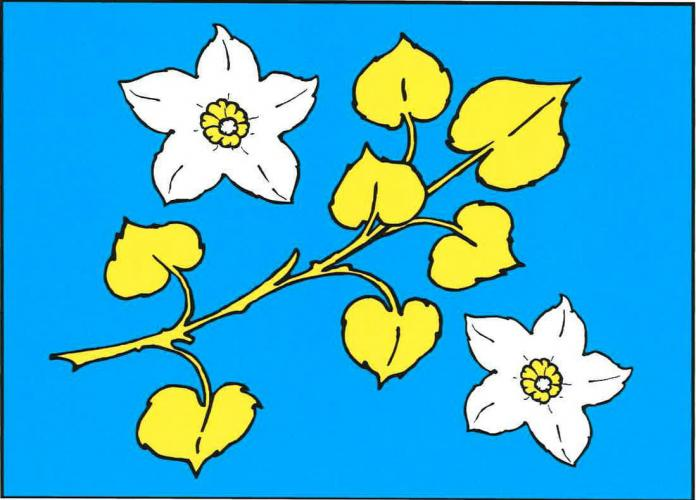
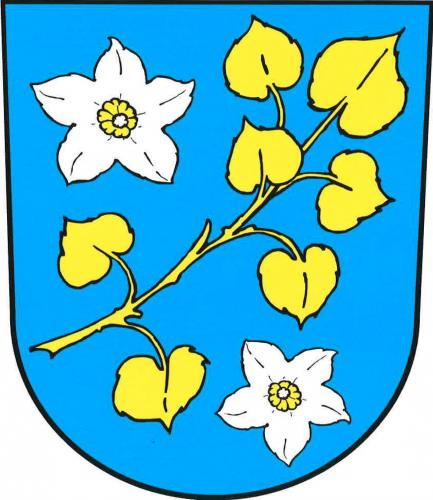
- Flag Coat of arms

- Location in the Czech Republic
- Coordinates: 49°32′3″N 15°32′25″E
- Country: Czech Republic
- Region: Vysočina
- District: Havlíčkův Brod
- First mentioned: 1307

Area
  - Total: 3.05 km^{2} (1.18 sq mi)
- Elevation: 526 m (1,726 ft)

Population (2026-01-01)
  - Total: 181
  - Density: 59.3/km^{2} (154/sq mi)
- Time zone: UTC+1 (CET)
  - Summer (DST): UTC+2 (CEST)
- Postal code: 582 53
- Website: www.kochanov.cz

Kochánov is a municipality and village in Havlíčkův Brod District in the Vysočina Region of the Czech Republic. It has about 200 inhabitants.

Kochánov lies approximately 9 kilometres (6 mi) south of Havlíčkův Brod, 16 km (10 mi) north of Jihlava, and 102 km (63 mi) south-east of Prague.

== Demographics ==
Historical population
Year	Pop.	±%
1869	179	—
1880	177	−1.1%
1890	171	−3.4%
1900	173	+1.2%
1910	174	+0.6%
1921	189	+8.6%
1930	166	−12.2%
1950	130	−21.7%
1961	161	+23.8%
1970	152	−5.6%
1980	148	−2.6%
1991	131	−11.5%
2001	146	+11.5%
2011	141	−3.4%
2021	177	+25.5%
Source: Censuses
