= Slavíkov =

- Municipality
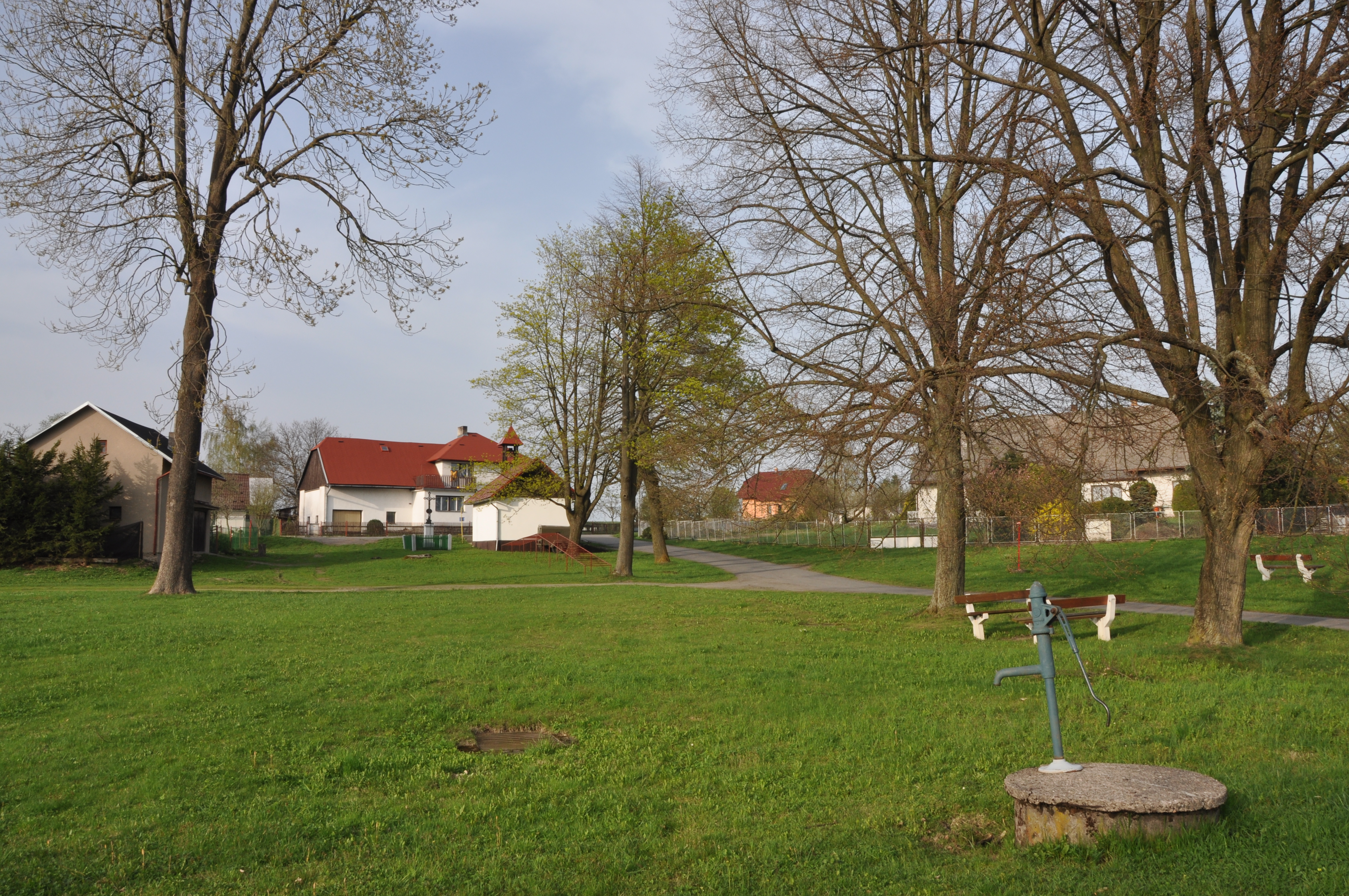
- Centre of Slavíkov

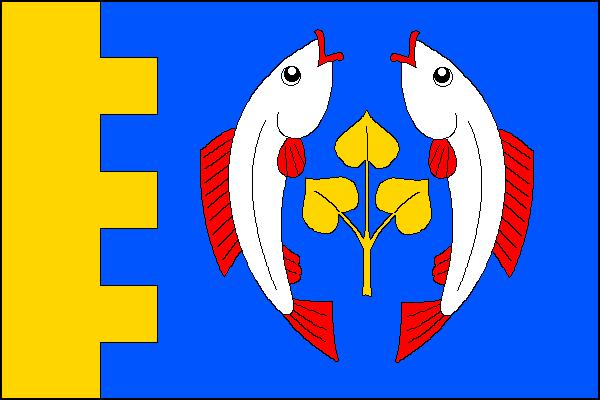
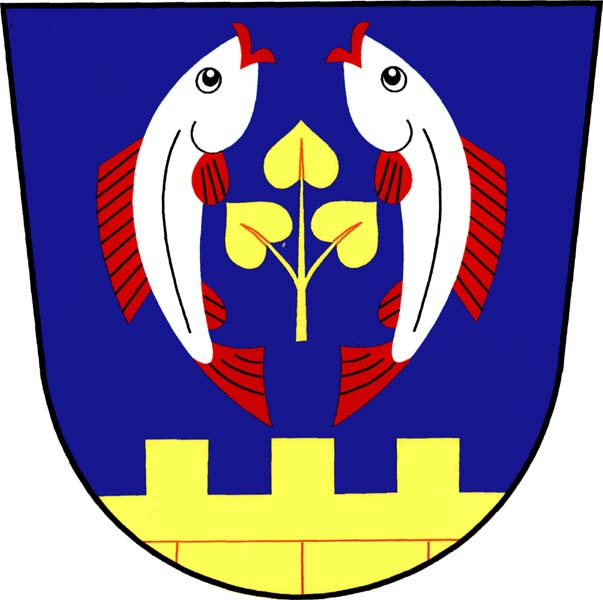
- Flag Coat of arms

- Location in the Czech Republic
- Coordinates: 49°44′34″N 15°46′51″E
- Country: Czech Republic
- Region: Vysočina
- District: Havlíčkův Brod
- First mentioned: 1415

Area
  - Total: 12.74 km^{2} (4.92 sq mi)
- Elevation: 602 m (1,975 ft)

Population (2026-01-01)
  - Total: 322
  - Density: 25.3/km^{2} (65.5/sq mi)
- Time zone: UTC+1 (CET)
  - Summer (DST): UTC+2 (CEST)
- Postal codes: 582 63, 582 65, 583 01
- Website: www.slavikov.cz

Slavíkov is a municipality and village in Havlíčkův Brod District in the Vysočina Region of the Czech Republic. It has about 300 inhabitants.

Slavíkov lies approximately 22 kilometres (14 mi) north-east of Havlíčkův Brod, 42 km (26 mi) north of Jihlava, and 105 km (65 mi) east of Prague.

== Administrative division ==
Slavíkov consists of eight municipal parts (in brackets population according to the 2021 census):

- Slavíkov (141)
- Dlouhý (14)
- Dolní Vestec (21)
- Horní Vestec (4)
- Kocourov (4)
- Rovný (103)
- Štikov (0)
- Zálesí (7)

== Demographics ==
Historical population
Year	Pop.	±%
1869	963	—
1880	996	+3.4%
1890	994	−0.2%
1900	1,002	+0.8%
1910	984	−1.8%
1921	914	−7.1%
1930	849	−7.1%
1950	645	−24.0%
1961	645	+0.0%
1970	539	−16.4%
1980	469	−13.0%
1991	340	−27.5%
2001	310	−8.8%
2011	333	+7.4%
2021	294	−11.7%
Source: Censuses
