= Prosíčka =

- Municipality
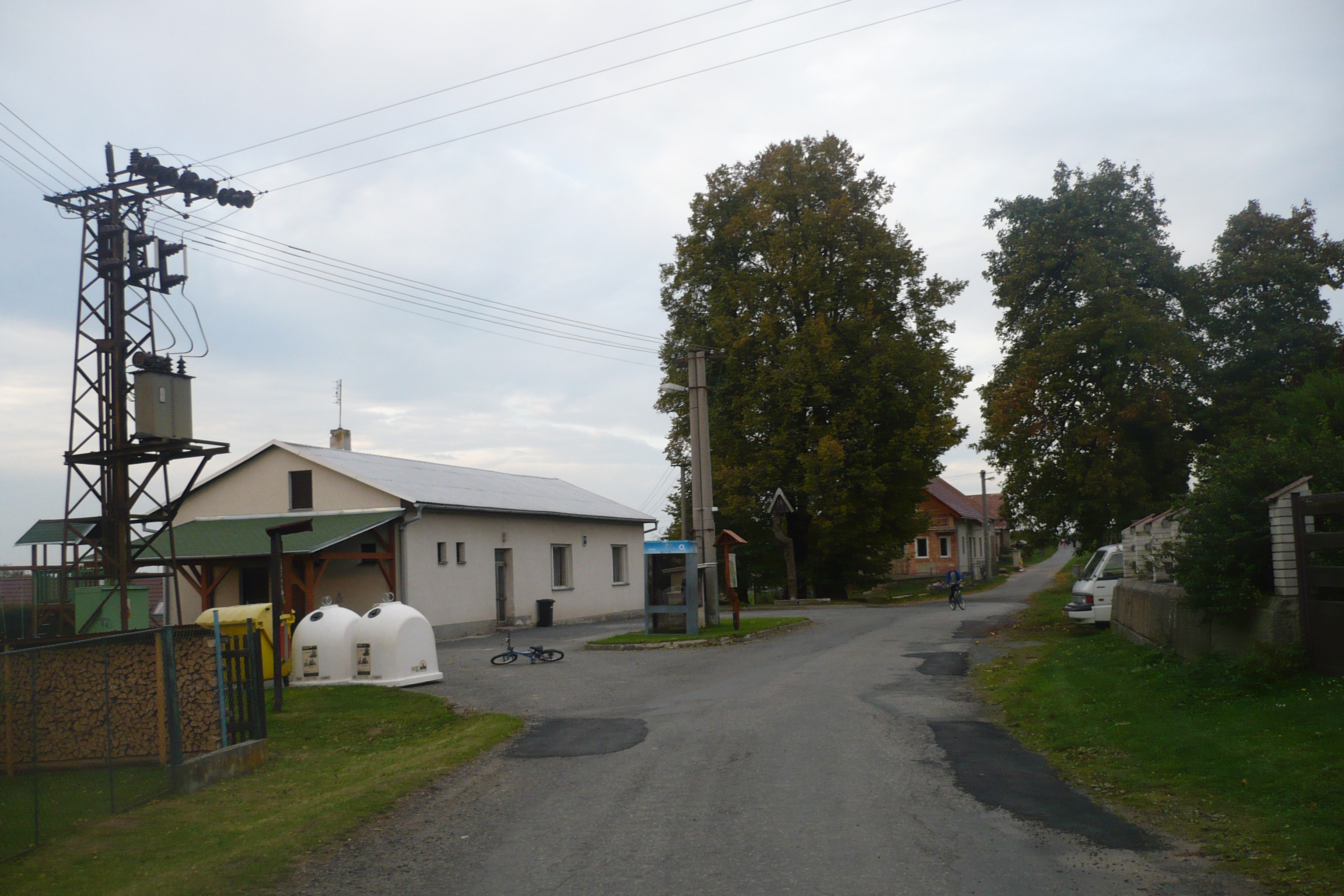
- Centre of Prosíčka

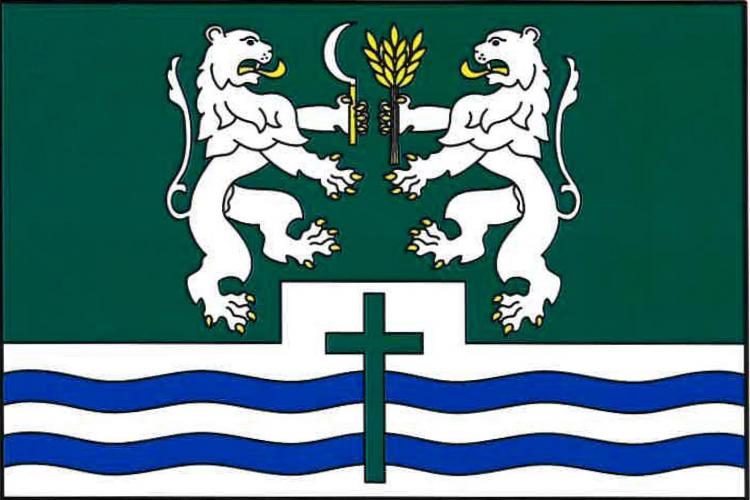
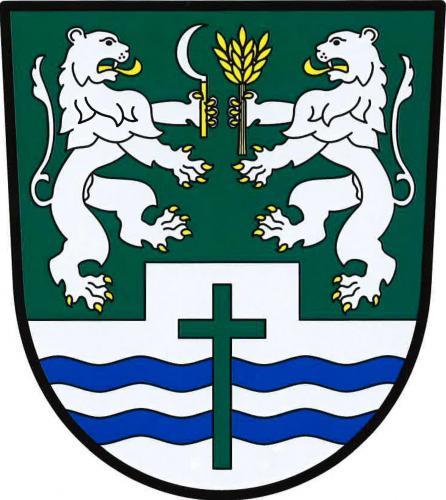
- Flag Coat of arms

- Location in the Czech Republic
- Coordinates: 49°43′38″N 15°19′20″E
- Country: Czech Republic
- Region: Vysočina
- District: Havlíčkův Brod
- First mentioned: 1457

Area
  - Total: 5.50 km^{2} (2.12 sq mi)
- Elevation: 518 m (1,699 ft)

Population (2026-01-01)
  - Total: 149
  - Density: 27.1/km^{2} (70.2/sq mi)
- Time zone: UTC+1 (CET)
  - Summer (DST): UTC+2 (CEST)
- Postal code: 584 01
- Website: www.prosicka.cz

Prosíčka is a municipality and village in Havlíčkův Brod District in the Vysočina Region of the Czech Republic. It has about 100 inhabitants.

Prosíčka lies approximately 23 kilometres (14 mi) north-west of Havlíčkův Brod, 41 km (25 mi) north-west of Jihlava, and 77 km (48 mi) south-east of Prague.

== Administrative division ==
Prosíčka consists of three municipal parts (in brackets population according to the 2021 census):

- Dolní Prosíčka (54)
- Horní Prosíčka (49)
- Nezdín (36)

== Demographics ==
Historical population
Year	Pop.	±%
1869	304	—
1880	277	−8.9%
1890	277	+0.0%
1900	249	−10.1%
1910	259	+4.0%
1921	245	−5.4%
1930	251	+2.4%
1950	185	−26.3%
1961	192	+3.8%
1970	176	−8.3%
1980	157	−10.8%
1991	127	−19.1%
2001	126	−0.8%
2011	128	+1.6%
2021	139	+8.6%
Source: Censuses
