= Oudoleň =

- Municipality
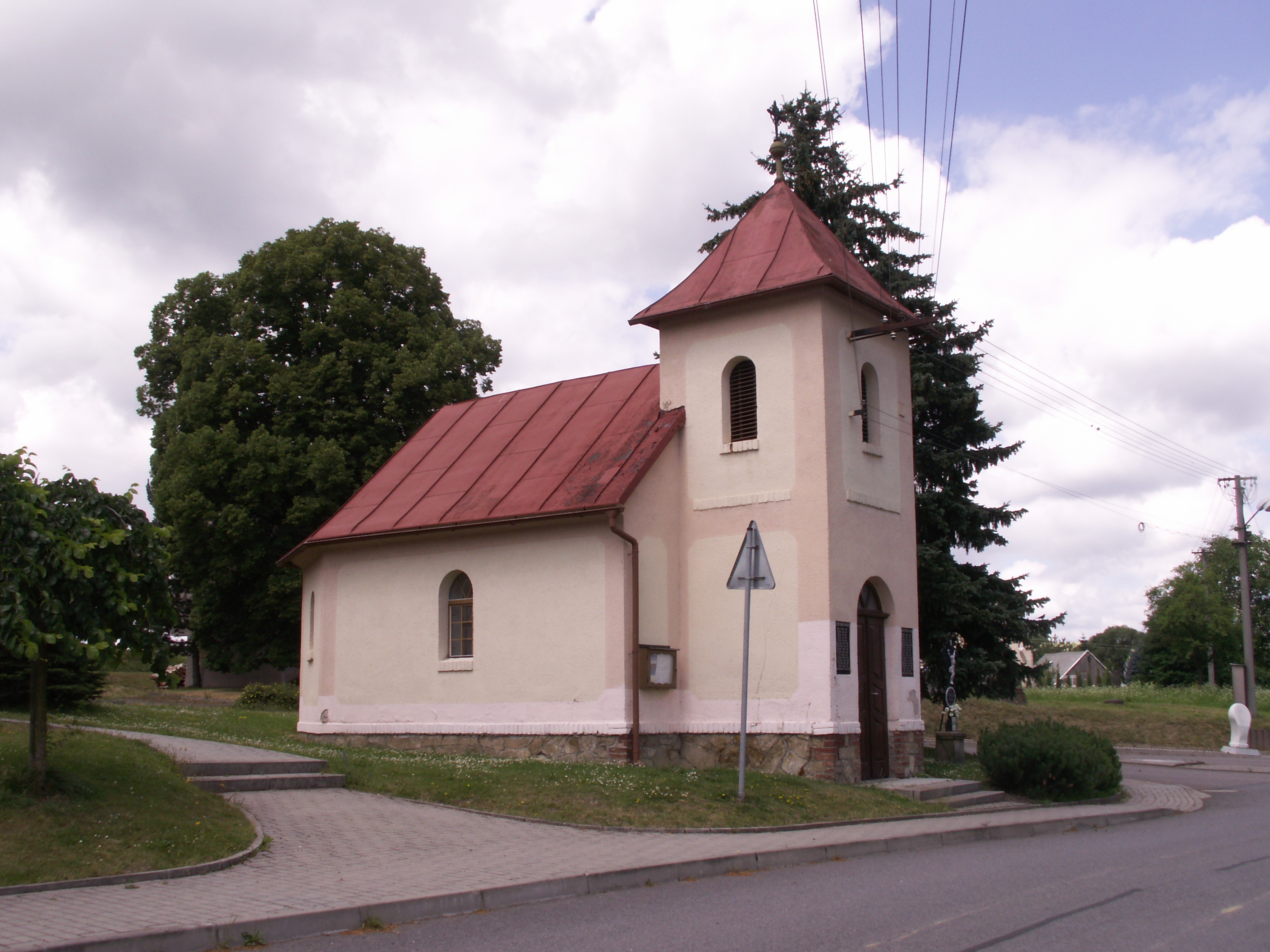
- Chapel of the Virgin Mary

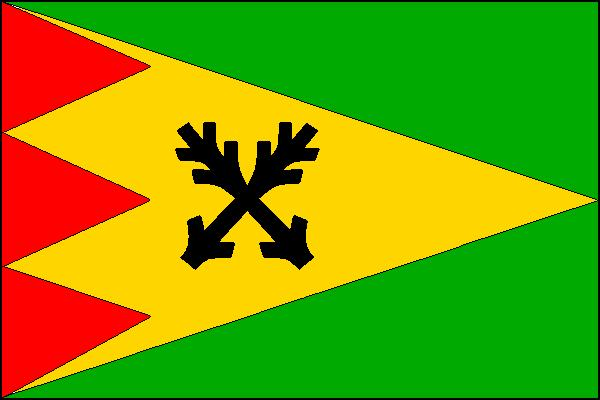
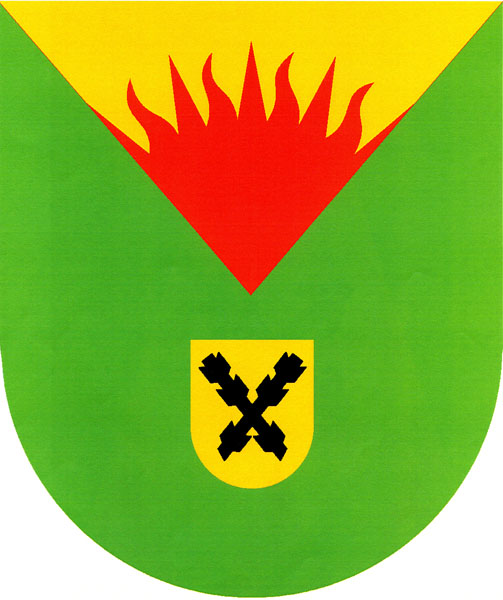
- Flag Coat of arms

- Location in the Czech Republic
- Coordinates: 49°39′34″N 15°45′20″E
- Country: Czech Republic
- Region: Vysočina
- District: Havlíčkův Brod
- First mentioned: 1397

Area
  - Total: 6.48 km^{2} (2.50 sq mi)
- Elevation: 550 m (1,800 ft)

Population (2026-01-01)
  - Total: 367
  - Density: 56.6/km^{2} (147/sq mi)
- Time zone: UTC+1 (CET)
  - Summer (DST): UTC+2 (CEST)
- Postal code: 582 24
- Website: www.oudolen.cz

Oudoleň (German: Audolen) is a municipality and village in Havlíčkův Brod District in the Vysočina Region of the Czech Republic. It has about 400 inhabitants.

Oudoleň lies approximately 15 kilometres (9 mi) north-east of Havlíčkův Brod, 32 km (20 mi) north-east of Jihlava, and 108 km (67 mi) south-east of Prague.

== Demographics ==
Historical population
Year	Pop.	±%
1869	839	—
1880	781	−6.9%
1890	787	+0.8%
1900	752	−4.4%
1910	742	−1.3%
1921	674	−9.2%
1930	632	−6.2%
1950	493	−22.0%
1961	548	+11.2%
1970	497	−9.3%
1980	425	−14.5%
1991	359	−15.5%
2001	349	−2.8%
2011	355	+1.7%
2021	353	−0.6%
Source: Censuses

== Notable people ==
- Milan Chalupa (born 1953), ice hockey player
