= Knyk =

- Municipality
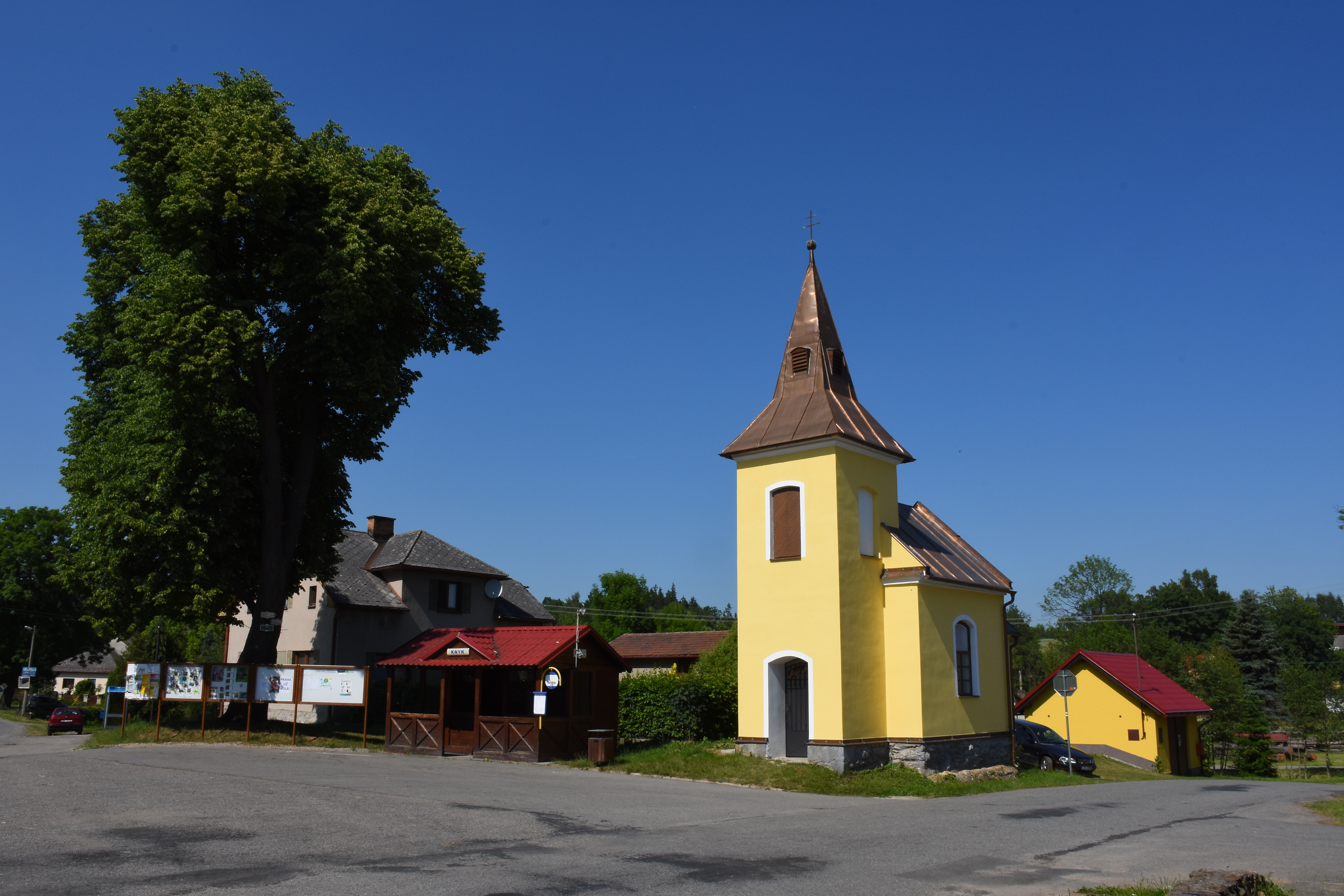
- Centre of Knyk

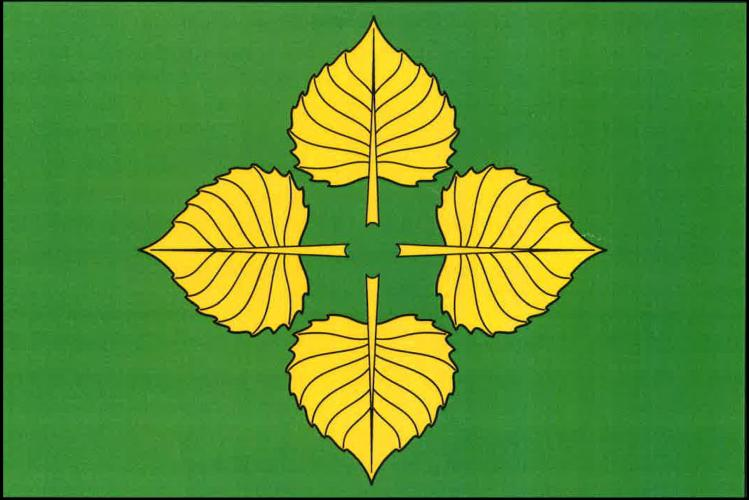
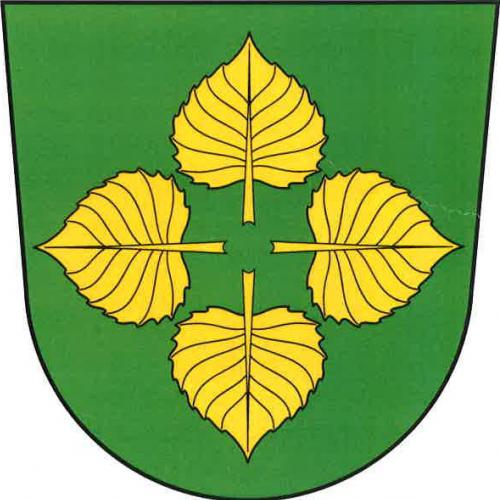
- Flag Coat of arms

- Location in the Czech Republic
- Coordinates: 49°38′49″N 15°34′43″E
- Country: Czech Republic
- Region: Vysočina
- District: Havlíčkův Brod
- First mentioned: 1472

Area
  - Total: 6.50 km^{2} (2.51 sq mi)
- Elevation: 500 m (1,600 ft)

Population (2026-01-01)
  - Total: 439
  - Density: 67.5/km^{2} (175/sq mi)
- Time zone: UTC+1 (CET)
  - Summer (DST): UTC+2 (CEST)
- Postal code: 580 01
- Website: www.obecknyk.cz

Knyk is a municipality and village in Havlíčkův Brod District in the Vysočina Region of the Czech Republic. It has about 400 inhabitants.

Knyk lies approximately 5 kilometres (3 mi) north of Havlíčkův Brod, 28 km (17 mi) north of Jihlava, and 97 km (60 mi) south-east of Prague.

== Administrative division ==
Knyk consists of two municipal parts (in brackets population according to the 2021 census):

- Knyk (323)
- Rozňák (108)

== Demographics ==
Historical population
Year	Pop.	±%
1869	348	—
1880	358	+2.9%
1890	312	−12.8%
1900	312	+0.0%
1910	323	+3.5%
1921	363	+12.4%
1930	333	−8.3%
1950	324	−2.7%
1961	308	−4.9%
1970	315	+2.3%
1980	312	−1.0%
1991	307	−1.6%
2001	325	+5.9%
2011	381	+17.2%
2021	431	+13.1%
Source: Censuses
