= Kynice =

- Municipality
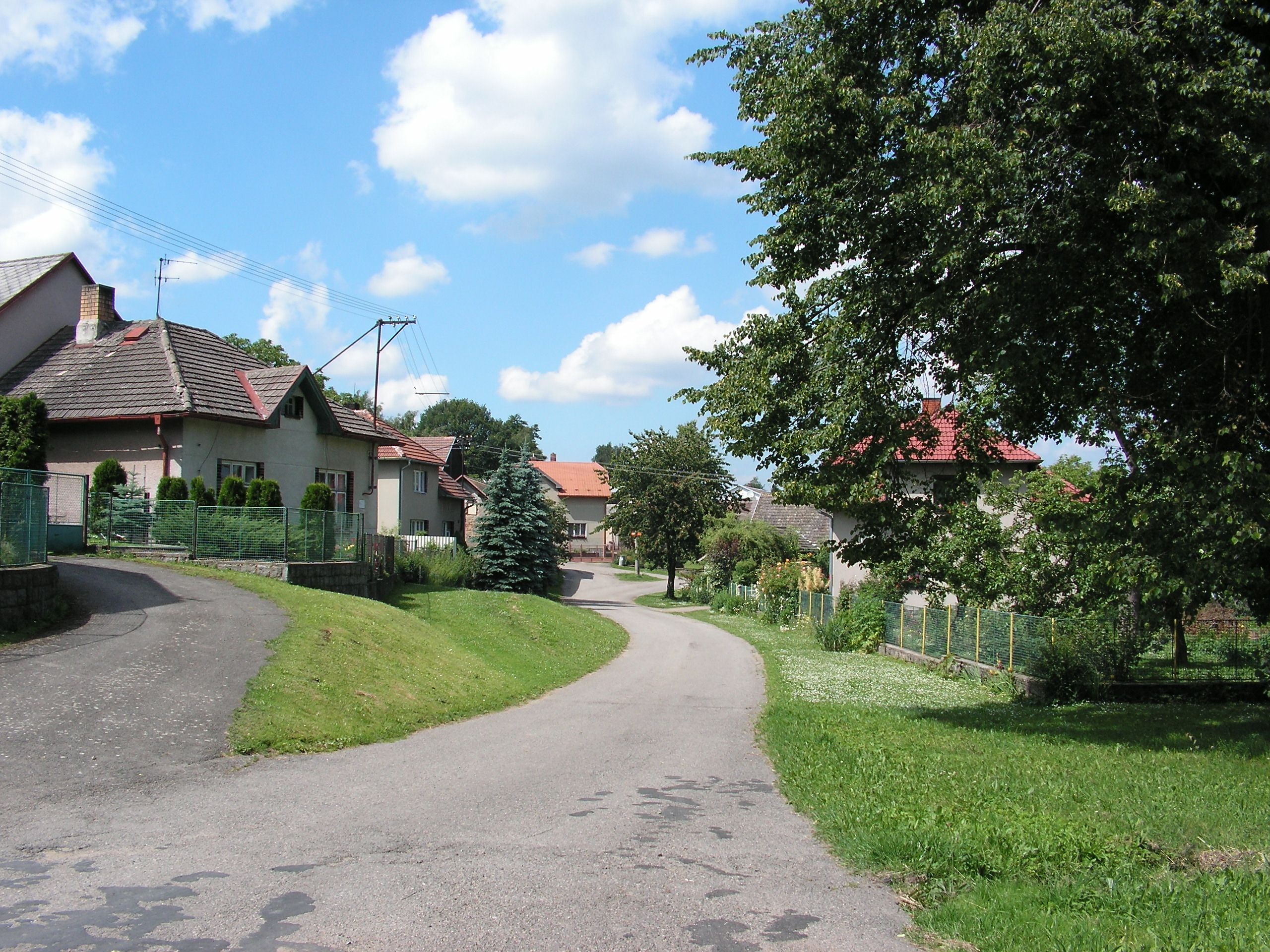
- Side street

- Location in the Czech Republic
- Coordinates: 49°44′21″N 15°21′37″E
- Country: Czech Republic
- Region: Vysočina
- District: Havlíčkův Brod
- First mentioned: 1341

Area
  - Total: 3.90 km^{2} (1.51 sq mi)
- Elevation: 545 m (1,788 ft)

Population (2026-01-01)
  - Total: 103
  - Density: 26.4/km^{2} (68.4/sq mi)
- Time zone: UTC+1 (CET)
  - Summer (DST): UTC+2 (CEST)
- Postal code: 584 01
- Website: www.kynice.cz

Kynice is a municipality and village in Havlíčkův Brod District in the Vysočina Region of the Czech Republic. It has about 100 inhabitants.

Kynice lies approximately 22 kilometres (14 mi) north-west of Havlíčkův Brod, 42 km (26 mi) north-west of Jihlava, and 79 km (49 mi) south-east of Prague.

== Demographics ==
Historical population
Year	Pop.	±%
1869	239	—
1880	233	−2.5%
1890	204	−12.4%
1900	198	−2.9%
1910	190	−4.0%
1921	189	−0.5%
1930	190	+0.5%
1950	162	−14.7%
1961	154	−4.9%
1970	146	−5.2%
1980	124	−15.1%
1991	125	+0.8%
2001	96	−23.2%
2011	86	−10.4%
2021	95	+10.5%
Source: Censuses
