= Antonín Dušek =

Czech ice hockey player

- Born: 8 April 1986 (age 40) Havlíčkův Brod, Czechoslovakia
- Height: 6 ft 0 in (183 cm)
- Weight: 194 lb (88 kg; 13 st 12 lb)
- Position: Centre
- Shoots: Left
- Ligue Magnus team Former teams: Aigles de Nice; HC Bílí Tygři Liberec; HC Slavia Praha; Piráti Chomutov; HC Karlovy Vary; HC Dynamo Pardubice
- Playing career: 2006–present

Antonín Dušek (born 8 April 1986) is a Czech professional ice hockey Centre for Aigles de Nice in the Ligue Magnus. He previously played in the Czech Extraliga for HC Bílí Tygři Liberec, HC Slavia Praha, Piráti Chomutov, HC Karlovy Vary and HC Dynamo Pardubice.

According to an interview with hokej.cz, he started to play ice hockey at 3 or 4 years old, on a lake in the town Ledeč nad Sázavou.
