= Ignác František Mara =

Czech cellist and composer

Ignác František Mara (also written as Mára; Latin: Ignatius Mara, German: Ignaz Mara; 1709–1783) was a Czech cellist and composer of late Baroque to Classical transition era.

== Life ==
Ignác František Mára (also commonly Ignaz or Ignatius Mara) was born in Havlíčkův Brod, Bohemia, where he began his musical education.

In 1742 he began his employment as a chamber musician at the Royal Court in Berlin, where he received an annual salary of 600 thaler. In his youth Mara was known as a fine soloist, whose tone and manner of performance were extremely moving. By 1779, while no longer performing as a soloist, he was noted as an excellent orchestral musician. He died in Berlin in 1783.

Ignác's son, Johann Baptist also became a cellist and composer, active in Berlin. Johann Baptist was involved in a difficult marriage to the soprano Gertrud Elisabeth Mara. Ignác's younger brother, Kajetan, was an organist, choir director and composer of sacred music in St. Vitus Cathedral in Prague.

== Works ==
Mara was said by Gerber to have been the most "correct" composer for the cello and composed many solos, duets and concertos for it.

The only work which can be attributed with certainty to Ignác Mara is a Concerto in E♭ for viola, strings and continuo. The Concerto survives in two manuscript sources in the archive of the Sing-Akademie zu Berlin, and is ascribed in both sources to "Ignazio Mara". Any attempt to attribute further works to either Ignác, or his son Johann Baptist, is hampered by the fact that all other manuscripts are signed only "Mara". This is even more difficult by the fact that both musicians composed in similar genres; solo and chamber works for cello and a stylistic evaluation is yet to be undertaken. Below is a list of these works.

- Oboe Sonata in B♭ major "Dell Sigr Mara" in Sing-Akademie zu Berlin (attributed to Ignác Mara in RISM)
- Cello Sonata in E major "di Mara" in Musik- och teaterbiblioteket, Stockholm: Wallenbergs Samling
- 4 Cello Sonatas "del Sigr Mara" in Musik- och teaterbiblioteket, Stockholm
- Cello Concerto in F major in Musik- och teaterbiblioteket, Stockholm: Alströmer Samling. Also listed in Breitkopf's catalogue
- Cello Concerto in C major in Musik- och teaterbiblioteket, Stockholm: Alströmer Samling
- Viola Sonata in C major "di Mara" in Staatsbibliothek zu Berlin (attributed to Johann Baptist Mara in RISM)
- Duetto in G major for 2 Violas in Staatsbibliothek zu Berlin (attributed to Johann Baptist Mara in RISM)

Lost works attributed to "Mara" listed in Breitkopf's catalogues include:

- 6 Cello Sonatas
- Duetto violin and cello
- Cello Sonata in D major
