= Havlíčkův Brod Brewery =

Brewery in the Czech Republic

- Rebel beer

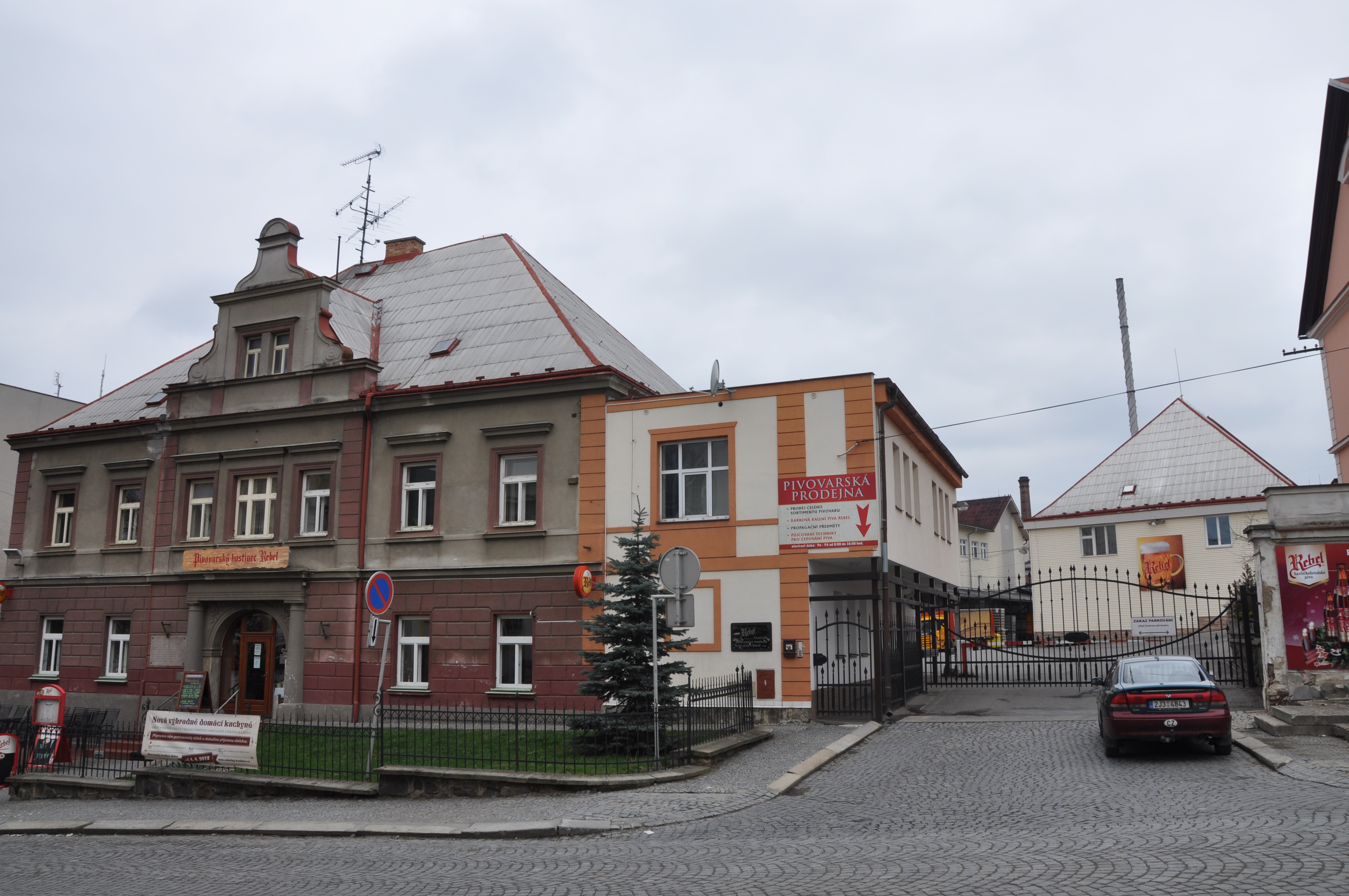
- Havlíčkův Brod Brewery
- Location: Havlíčkův Brod, Czech Republic
- Coordinates: 49.6102°N 15.5766°E
- Opened: 24 January 1995
- Website: www.hbrebel.cz

The town brewery of Havlíčkův Brod (Havlíčkobrodský pivovar) produces Rebel brand beer.

== History ==
Originally named Smilův Brod in honor of the town's owner, Smil (present-day Havlíčkův Brod) was changed to Německý Brod due to the settlement of German people. That's important because Německý Brod's German settlers won the right to brew beer in the 14th century when King Jan of Luxembourg gave contractual rights to Německý Brod's owner, Jindřich of Lipé.

What followed King Jan's ruling was typical throughout central Europe during the Middle Ages where townspeople brewed beer in many local breweries. But the microbrews produced in such primitive conditions of the era were usually of dangerously poor quality. So, brewers banded together to form larger, better-equipped breweries. As a result, by the end of the 18th century, the town of Havlíčkův Brod (or Německý Brod) had only two large breweries. And then, sadly, one brewery closed due to high costs while the other burned to the ground, leaving the people of Havlíčkův Brod bereft of beer.

In response to the loss of that duo of breweries, the people of Havlíčkův Brod pooled their resources and—on October 18, 1834—purchased the house of Bukovský in order to build a new brewery for themselves (which would ultimately become the modern Rebel brand of beer.)

That Havlíčkův Brod town brewery became so successful that, by the late 19th century, production could not meet with demand. And so the facility underwent a much needed expansion at the time, which was completed on October 12, 1880. Naturally, refurbishments ensued following each of the World Wars of the 20th century.

The brewery was nationalized in 1948 and Havlíčkobrodský pivovar became part of Horácký Breweries Jihlava and later part of East-bohemian Breweries Hradec Králové. In 1990, the brewery became an independent company and then, in 1995, descendants of the original owners reacquired the brewery. Since then, the brewery has remained part of the stock company Měšťanský pivovar Havlíčkův Brod, a.s., with annual beer production of 8.4 million liters.

== Beers produced ==
The brewery of Havlíčkův Brod produces light, bottom-fermented pilsner beers and dark, bottom-fermented beers.

- Rebel Original Premium 12° (4.8% by volume) pale lager
- Black Rebel 12° (4.7% by volume) dark lager
- Czech Rebel Beer (4.4% by volume) lager for export
- Rebel Traditional 10° (3.9% by volume) pale draught beer
- Hašek's C.K. Rebel 10° (4.1% by volume) pale draught beer
- Rebel Holiday Special (5.9% by volume) pale draught beer
- Rebel Yeast (5.0% by volume) unfiltered tapped directly from lager tanks for immediate consumption
- Non-Alcoholic Rebel (0-0.5% by volume)
- Hradecký Votrok 11° (4.8% by volume) pale draught beer
- Hradecká 10° (4.4% by volume) pale draught beer
- Rebel Blended Lager (4.8% by volume) blended lager
- Svitavák Draught Beer (3.9% by volume) pale draught beer
- Svitavák Lager Beer (4.8% by volume) pale lager beer

== Awards ==
The beers of the Havlíčkobrodský pivovar have won several awards and placed in competitions nearly every year of the last decade.

2000:

- Rebel Original Premium – Pivo České Republiky 1st Place
- Black Rebel – Pivo České Republiky 1st Place

2001:

- Traditional Rebel – Pivo České Republiky 2nd Place

2003:

- Rebel Original Premium – Dočesná Žatec 3rd Place
- Czech Rebel Beer – Dočesná Žatec 3rd Place

2006:

- Black Rebel – Cena Českých Sládků 1st Place
- Black Rebel – Dočesná Žatec 1st Place
- Black Rebel – Pivo České Republiky 3rd Place
- Black Rebel – Česká Pivní Pečeť 2nd Place

2007:

- Rebel Original Premium – Cena Českých Sládků 1st Place
- Black Rebel – Dočesná Žatec 1st Place
- Black Rebel – Pivo České Republiky 2nd Place
- Hašek's C.K. Rebel – Cena Českých Sládků 3rd Place
- Hašek's C.K. Rebel – Pivo České Republiky 3rd Place

2008:

- Rebel Original Premium – Pivo České Republiky 3rd Place
- Black Rebel – Česká Pivní Pečeť 1st Place
- Black Rebel – Pivo České Republiky 3rd Place
- Black Rebel – Pivo České Republiky 2nd Place
- Black Rebel – Dočesná Žatec 1st Place
- Black Rebel – Cena Českých Sládků 3rd Place
- Black Rebel – České Pivo 1st Place
- Czech Rebel Beer – Dočesná Žatec 3rd Place
- Czech Rebel Beer – Česká Pivní Pečeť 2nd Place

2009:

- Black Rebel – Pivo České Republiky 2nd Place
- Black Rebel – Česká Pivní Pečeť 3rd Place
- Black Rebel – České Pivo 1st Place
- Black Rebel – European Beer Star 3rd Place
- Czech Rebel Beer – Pivo České Republiky 1st Place
- Rebel Holiday Special – Pivo České Republiky 2nd Place
- Rebel Holiday Special – Znojemský Hrozen 3rd Place
- Rebel Yeast – Dočesná Žatec 3rd Place
- Rebel Yeast – Pivo České Republiky 3rd Place

2010:

- Black Rebel – Pivo České Republiky 2nd Place
- Rebel Yeast – Dočesná Žatec 2nd Place
- Rebel Yeast – Česká Pivní Pečeť 2nd Place

2011:

- Black Rebel – Časopis “Pivo, Bier & Ale” 2nd Place
- Black Rebel – Pivo České Republiky 2nd Place
- Black Rebel – České Pivo 2nd Place
- Czech Rebel Beer – Dočesná Žatec 1st Place
