= Havlíčkův Brod Airfield =

Airport in the Czech Republic

Havlíčkův Brod Airfield Letiště Havlíčkův Brod
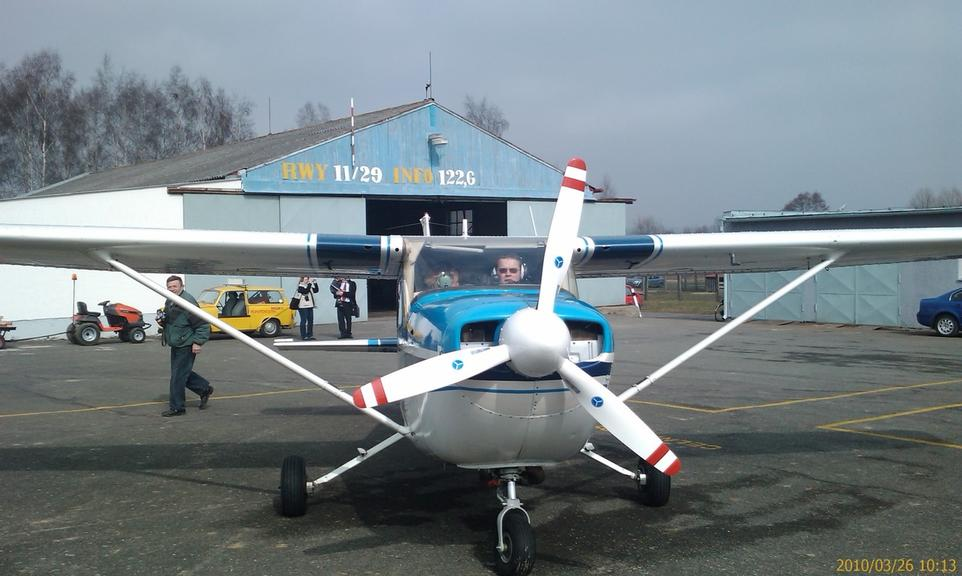
- IATA: none; ICAO: LKHB

Summary
- Airport type: Public, not a public international airport
- Operator: Aeroport Havlickuv Brod
- Serves: Havlíčkův Brod
- Location: 1 kilometre (0.62 mi) SW from Havlíčkův Brod
- Opened: September 1935
- Elevation AMSL: 1,519 ft / 465 m
- Coordinates: 49°35′50″N 15°32′57″E
- Website: www.aeroklubhb.cz
- Interactive map of Havlíčkův Brod Airfield

Runways
Direction	Length		Surface
Direction	m	ft	Surface
11/29	800	2,625	Grass

Havlíčkův Brod Airport (Czech: Letiště Havlíčkův Brod) (ICAO: LKHB) is a public domestic and non-public international airport located in the Havlíčkův Brod District in the Vysočina Region. It lies 2.4 km southwest of the centre of Havlíčkův Brod, near road I/34, between the villages and hamlets of Horní Papšíkov, Dolní Papšíkov, and Občiny, in the cadastral area of Poděbaby, and partially in Šmolovy u Havlíčkova Brodu. It has one grass runway.

== History ==
In the 1930s, a military airfield was constructed on the border of the cadastral areas of Poděbaby, Šmolovy, and Okrouhličtí Dvořáci. Construction officially began on 6 June 1936, following a decree of the Ministry of National Defence, ref. no. 1728, with the aim of stationing a bomber squadron. In October 1938, heavy bombers of the 3rd Squadron (85th and 86th Flights) of the 6th Air Regiment, specifically the Aero MB-200, were officially transferred to the unfinished Havlíčkův Brod airfield.

That same year, following the reorganization of Czech airspace, an aerial patrol of the Czechoslovak Gendarmerie was also relocated to the site, equipped with Avia B-534 and Letov Š-328 aircraft. The airfield was additionally used by the local branch of the Masaryk Aviation League for training purposes.

During the German occupation, the airfield—including its equipment and aircraft—was seized by the Luftwaffe and fully completed by the summer of 1940. It was then used primarily for pilot training.

== Operator ==
The airfield is operated by the Aeroclub Havlíčkův Brod – a registered association that includes both active and passive enthusiasts of aviation and other sports. The club brings together glider pilots, powered aircraft pilots, ultralight aviators, parachutists, model aircraft enthusiasts, and both flying and non-flying supporters. Its members range from amateur hobbyists to professional pilots, including commercial, airline, and military aviators. The Aeroclub Havlíčkův Brod was founded in 1935 and is a founding member of the Aeroclub of the Czech Republic.

The club's main activity is the provision of public-benefit services, primarily the promotion of sports and physical education in the areas of recreational and competitive flying, parachuting, and model aviation. It is also engaged in work with children and youth, focusing on their sports development, education, training, and outreach.

The Aeroclub Havlíčkův Brod was founded in 1935 and is a founding member of the Aeroclub of the Czech Republic.

The club's main mission is to provide public-benefit services, focusing on promoting sport and physical education in the field of recreational and competitive aviation, parachuting, and model aircraft flying. It is also active in working with children and youth, supporting their athletic development, education, training, and public outreach in aviation-related activities.

== Military Rescue Service Havlíčkův Brod ==
In 1992, the LPZS Kryštof 17 air rescue center was established in Havlíčkův Brod with two Mil Mi-2 helicopters. However, on December 31, 1992, the 52nd Reconnaissance and Command Squadron was disbanded. Eight Mi-2 helicopters were relocated to Prostějov. The LPZS Kryštof 17 center with two Mi-2 helicopters remained in Havlíčkův Brod as part of the 3rd Squadron of the 51st Helicopter Regiment.

Unresolved legislation regarding the role, authority,
