= Jan Novák (ice hockey) =

Czech ice hockey player (born 1979)

- Born: February 9, 1979 (age 46); Havlíčkův Brod, Czechoslovakia
- Height: 6 ft 0 in (183 cm)
- Weight: 189 lb (86 kg; 13 st 7 lb)
- Position: Defence
- Shoots: Right
- Czech Extraliga team Former teams: HC České Budějovice; HC Slavia Prague
- Playing career: 1997–present

Jan Novák (born February 9, 1979, in Havlíčkův Brod, Czechoslovakia) is a Czech professional ice hockey player. He spent nine seasons with HC Slavia Prague in the Czech Extraliga between 1997 and 2006, winning the championship in 2003. Novák moved to the Russian Super League in 2006 and played one season for Aq Bars Kazan. He later played for Skellefteå AIK of Elitserien in Sweden but left them early in the 2007–08 season for a move to HC Slavia Praha. On 12 January 2009 he was loaned to BK Mladá Boleslav. Novák currently plays with HC České Budějovice in the Czech Extraliga.
