= Petr Zelenka (serial killer) =

Czech serial killer

- Born: February 27, 1976 (age 50); Czech Republic
- Convictions: Murder, Attempted murder
- Penalty: Life Imprisonment

Details
- Victims: 7
- Span of crimes: May – December 2006
- Country: Czech Republic
- State: Havlíčkův Brod

Petr Zelenka (born February 27, 1976) is a Czech serial killer. As a nurse in hospital Havlíčkův Brod, 100 kilometres (62 mi) southeast of Prague, he murdered seven patients by lethal injection, and attempted to kill 10 others between May and December, 2006. He killed with a hidden vial of heparin — a blood-thinning drug causing internal bleeding when administered in large doses. His lawyer has been quoted as saying that Zelenka may have killed on an impulse to "test" doctors in Havlíčkův Brod, in the belief they were not good enough to discover the truth. In February 2008, Zelenka was convicted of killing seven patients and attempting to kill 10 others, and sentenced to life imprisonment.

== Biography ==
Zelenka was born on February 27, 1976, as the firstborn child of a family of high school-educated parents. He has a younger sister.

== See also ==
- List of serial killers by country
- List of serial killers by number of victims
