= Havlíčkův Brod =

- Town
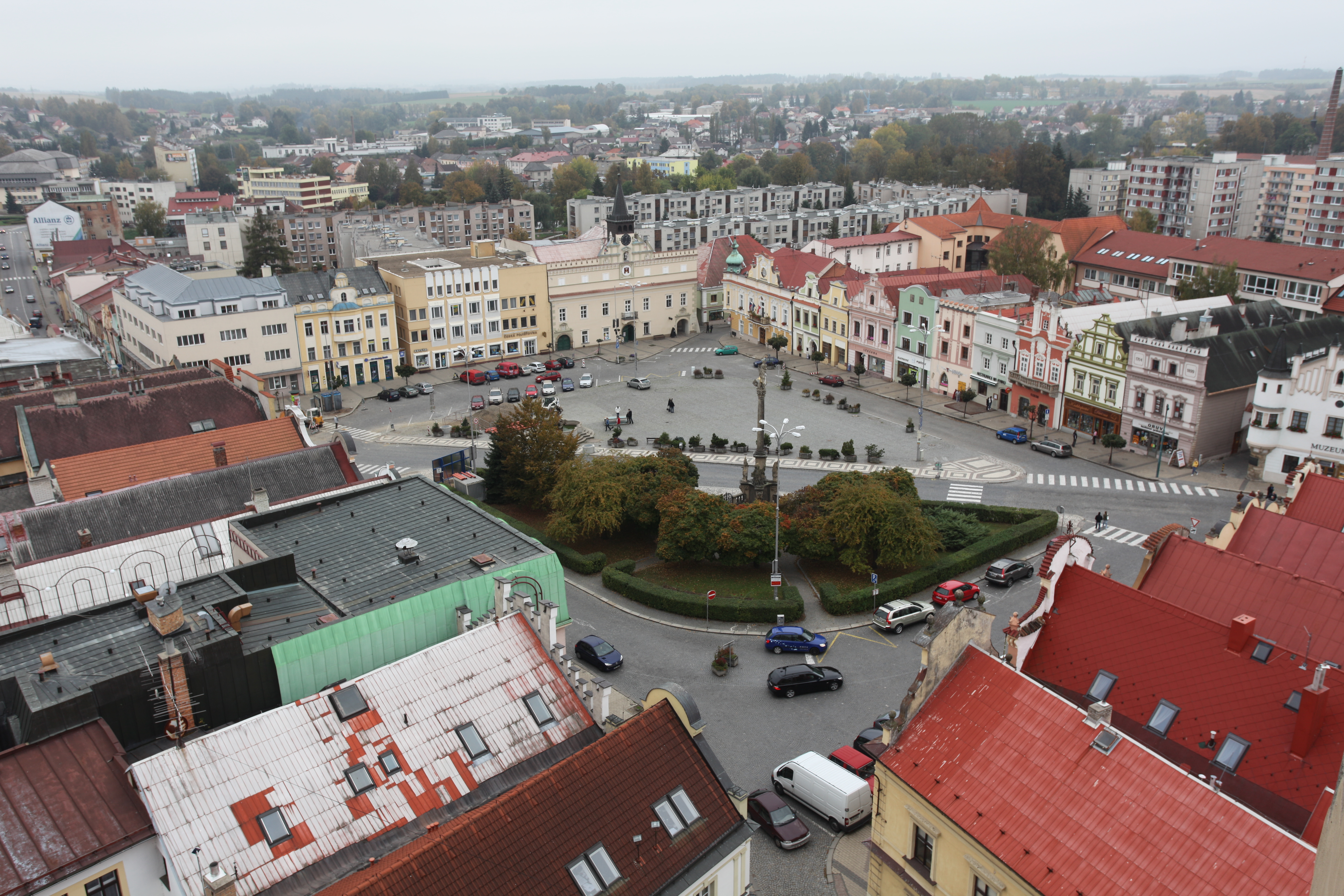
- Havlíčkovo náměstí seen from the church tower

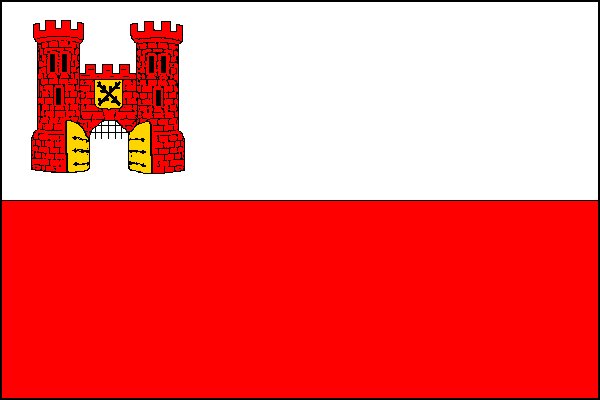
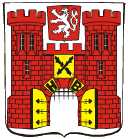
- Flag Coat of arms

- Location in the Czech Republic
- Coordinates: 49°36′28″N 15°34′51″E
- Country: Czech Republic
- Region: Vysočina
- District: Havlíčkův Brod
- First mentioned: 1256

Government
  - Mayor: Zbyněk Stejskal (ODS)

Area
  - Total: 64.93 km^{2} (25.07 sq mi)
- Elevation: 422 m (1,385 ft)

Population (2026-01-01)
  - Total: 23,368
  - Density: 359.9/km^{2} (932.1/sq mi)
- Time zone: UTC+1 (CET)
  - Summer (DST): UTC+2 (CEST)
- Postal code: 580 01
- Website: www.muhb.cz

Havlíčkův Brod (Czech pronunciation: [ˈɦavliːtʃkuːf ˈbrot]; until 1945 Německý Brod; German: Deutschbrod) is a town in Havlíčkův Brod District in the Vysočina Region of the Czech Republic. It has about 24,000 inhabitants. It is located on the Sázava River in the Upper Sázava Hills. The town is a road and railway hub and has a tradition in the textile industry.

Havlíčkův Brod was founded in the mid-13th century. The historic town centre is well preserved and is protected as an urban monument zone. The most valuable buildings, protected as national cultural monuments, are the Old Town Hall and the Štáfl Cottage.

== Administrative division ==
Havlíčkův Brod consists of 14 municipal parts (in brackets population according to the 2021 census):

- Havlíčkův Brod (20,151)
- Březinka (67)
- Herlify (93)
- Jilemník (70)
- Klanečná (19)
- Květnov (126)
- Mírovka (420)
- Poděbaby (513)
- Šmolovy (527)
- Suchá (212)
- Svatý Kříž (362)
- Termesivy (251)
- Veselice (55)
- Zbožice (54)

Jilemník and Zbožice form two exclaves of the municipal territory.

== Etymology ==
The Czech word brod means 'ford'. The town was firstly named Brod and then Smilův Brod ("Smil's Ford") after its founder Smil of Lichtenburk. In the 14th century, it was renamed Německý Brod ("German Ford") because of its predominantly German population. Because of Anti-German sentiment after World War II, the town was renamed Havlíčkův Brod ("Havlíček's Ford") in honour of the writer Karel Havlíček Borovský, who was born nearby and grew up and studied in the town. It was the very first town out of many to be renamed in 1945.

== Geography ==
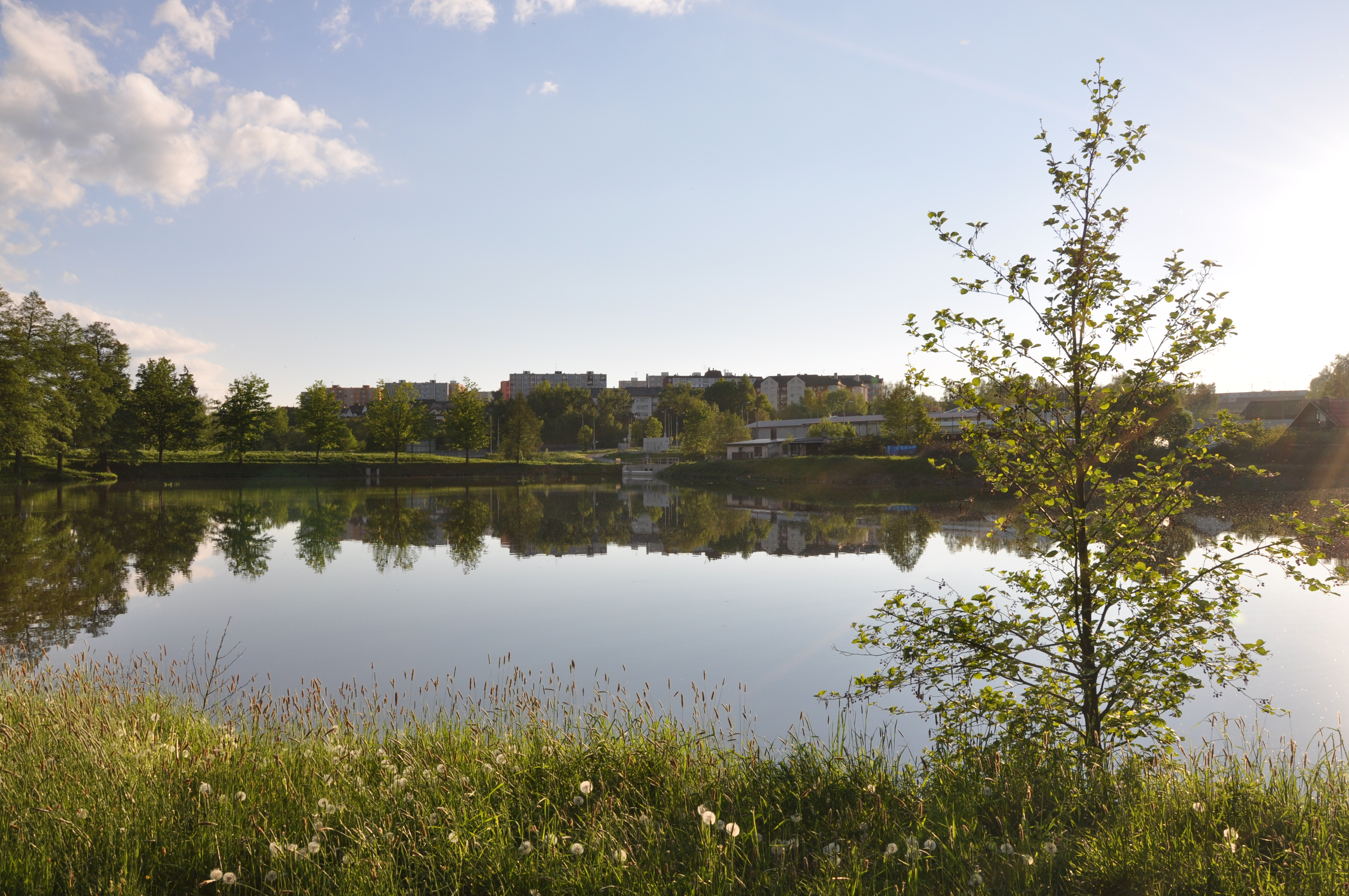
Housing estates behind Cihlář Pond

Havlíčkův Brod is located roughly in the geographical centre of the country, about 21 kilometres (13 mi) north of Jihlava. It lies in the Upper Sázava Hills. The highest point is the hill Volský vrch at 598 m (1,962 ft) above sea level, located in the Zbožice exclave. The Sázava River flows through the town. Many smaller tributaries of the Sázava flow through the municipal territory: Cihlářský potok, Žabinec, Šlapanka with its tributary Stříbrný potok, Úsobský potok, Rozkošský potok, and Břevnický potok.

There are systems of fishponds supplied by some of these watercourses. Several ponds on the Cihlářský potok are located in the urban area. The largest pond of the Cihlářský potok is Cihlář Pond, which serves also recreational purposes and water sports. The largest water body in the municipal territory is the Žabinec water reservoir, supplied by the eponymous stream.

== History ==
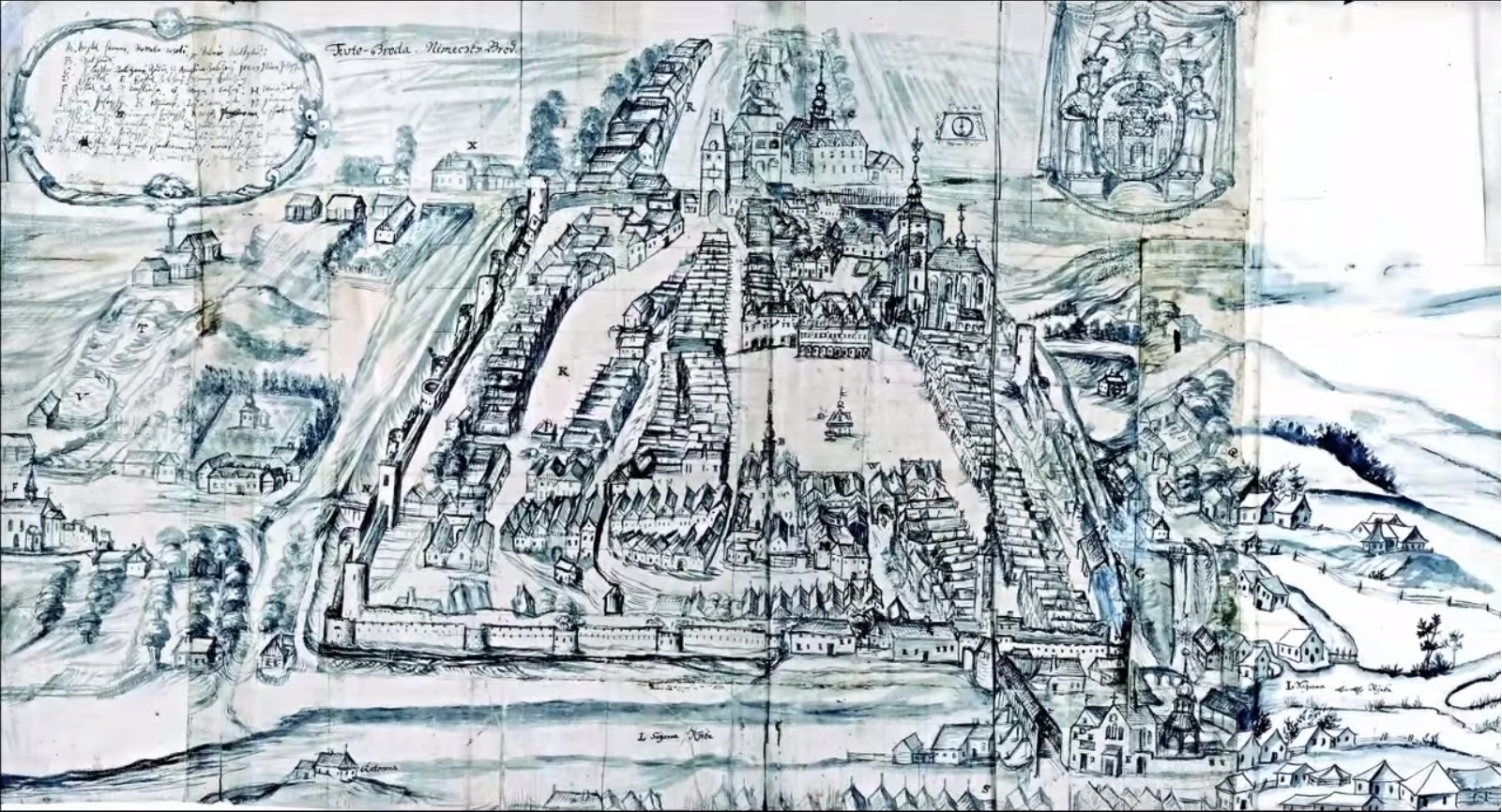
The oldest illustration of the town, c. 1690

According to a legend recorded by chronicler Wenceslaus Hajek, Brod was founded in 793, however, this year is highly unlikely. The first written mention of a settlement called Brod is from 1234, but it is referred to as probable counterfeit. The first credible mention of Brod is from 1265. The town was founded by Smil of Lichtenburk probably in 1251, on a trade route. In 1308, it was first called Německý Brod.

Brod was first an important mining town focused on silver mining, later it became a centre of crafts and agricultural production. During the Hussite Wars in 1422 as a result of Battle of Německý Brod, Brod was conquered by Jan Žižka and completely destroyed. The town was then resettled by predominantly Czech-speaking population. In 1436, it was bought by the Trčka of Lípa family. Brod was renewed and in the 16th and 17th centuries, it prospered. In 1637, it became a royal town.

The prosperity ended with the Thirty Years' War. Brod was twice conquered and looted. In 1646, 1664 and 1680, the town was affected by plague epidemics. In 1662 and 1676, it was damaged by large fires. The most devastating flood hit the town in 1714.

During the 19th century, economical and cultural development occurred. In 1850, Brod became a district town. Brod was industrialised in the second half of the 19th century with an emphasis on textile and food industry. The railway was built in 1870 and the station later became an important hub.

== Demographics ==
Historical population

Year	Pop.	±%
1869	8,189	—
1880	8,811	+7.6%
1890	9,359	+6.2%
1900	10,240	+9.4%
1910	12,628	+23.3%

Year	Pop.	±%
1921	13,150	+4.1%
1930	15,232	+15.8%
1950	17,238	+13.2%
1961	17,533	+1.7%
1970	20,197	+15.2%

Year	Pop.	±%
1980	23,146	+14.6%
1991	24,472	+5.7%
2001	24,375	−0.4%
2011	23,769	−2.5%
2021	22,920	−3.6%

Source: Censuses

== Economy ==
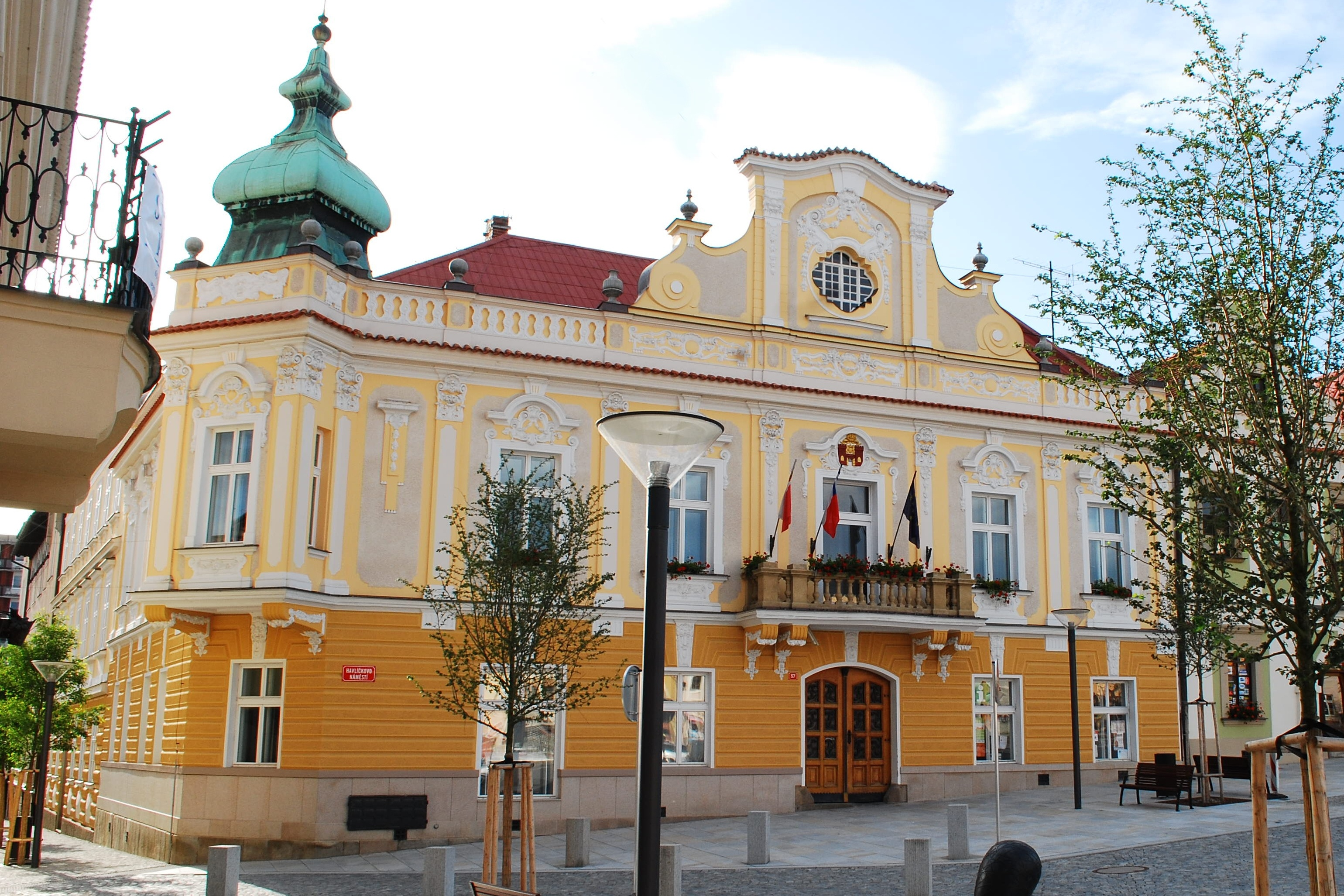
New Town Hall

Havlíčkův Brod has a medical hospital and a mental hospital, which are among the main employers in the town.

The main industrial employers based in the town are Futaba Czech s.r.o., a manufacturer of car parts, and Pleas a.s., a producer of underwear founded in 1939, which continues the long tradition of the textile industry in the town.

The Havlíčkův Brod Brewery is based in the town. It was founded in 1834.

== Transport ==
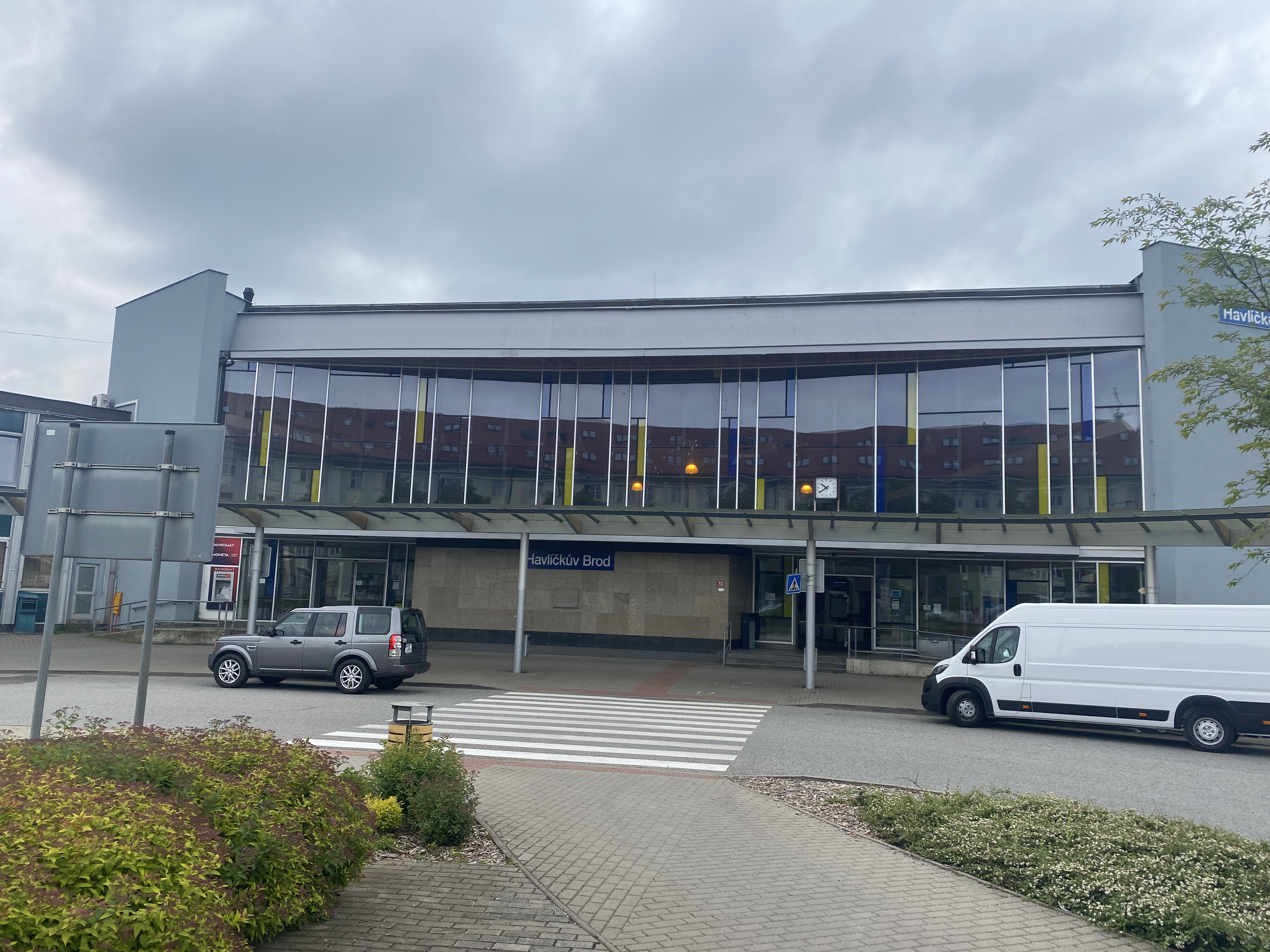
Train station

Havlíčkův Brod has both a road and a railway hub. There are five rail lines leading off the main station: to Kolín and Prague, to Pardubice, to Brno, to Jihlava and local lines to Humpolec and to Ledeč nad Sázavou. In addition to the main station, the municipal territory is served by four other train stops: Havlíčkův Brod-Perknov, Mírovka, Pohledští Dvořáci and Dolík.

The town is a crossing of two major Czech roads, I/34 from České Budějovice to Svitavy and I/38 from Mladá Boleslav to Jihlava, Znojmo and the Czech–Austrian border.

Havlíčkův Brod Airport is a small airport near the town. It serves mainly for sport and sightseeing flying.

== Sport ==
The town is home to the ice hockey club BK Havlíčkův Brod. Until 2015, it played in the 1st Czech Republic Hockey League.

FC Slovan Havlíčkův Brod is a football club, playing in lower amateur tiers.

== Sights ==
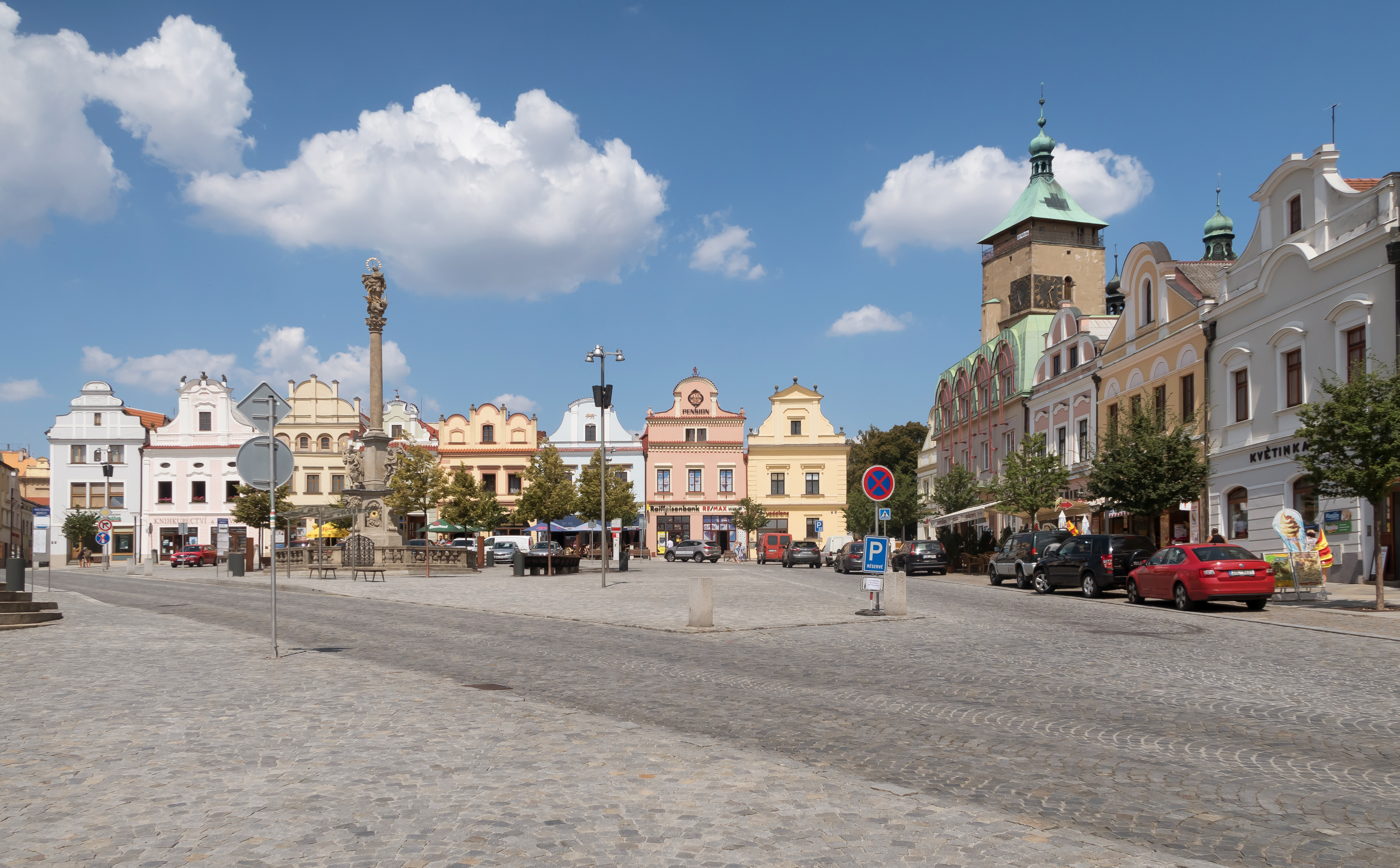
Havlíčkovo náměstí

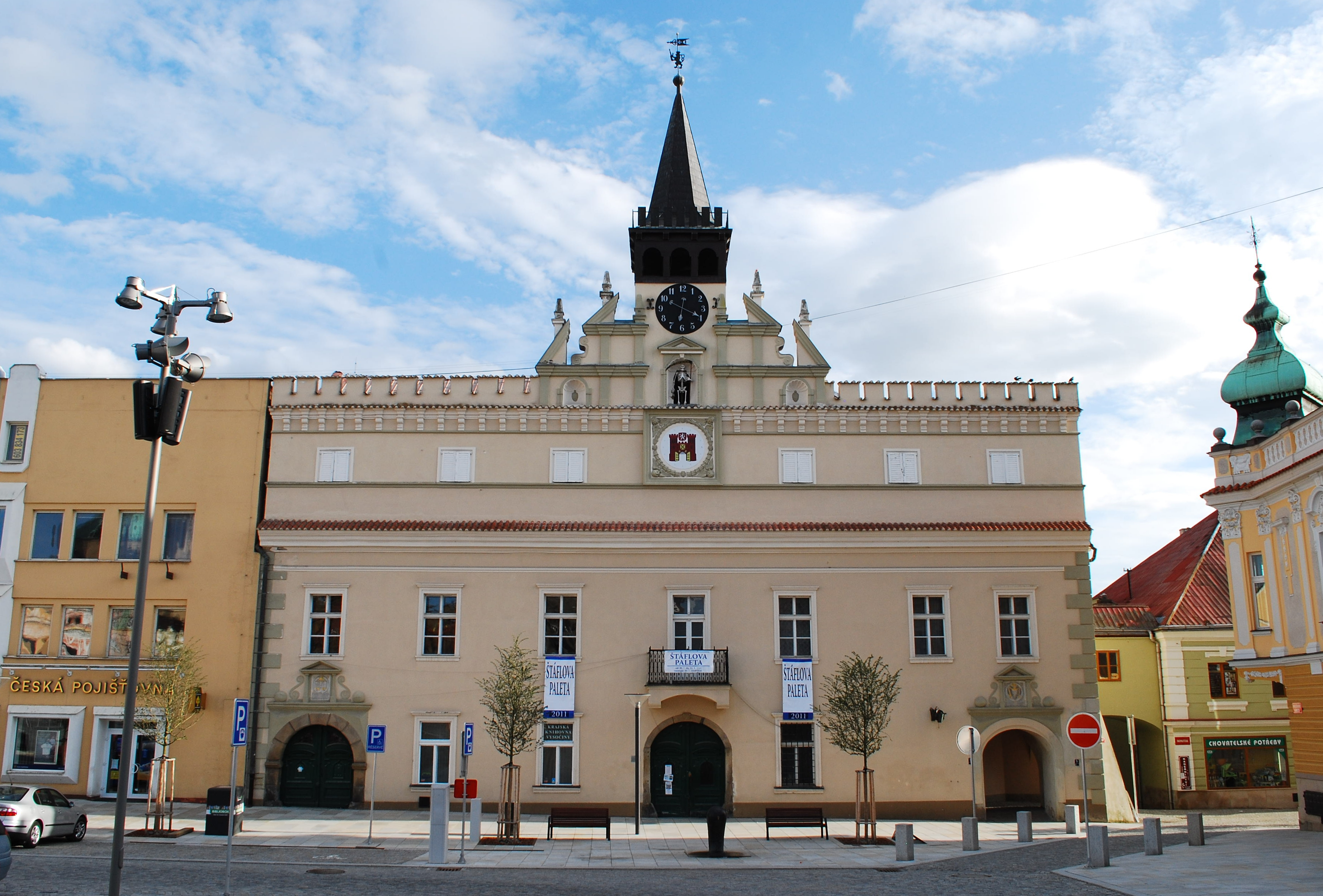
Old Town Hall

The historic centre was delimited by town fortifications. Several fragments are preserved to this day. In the centre is the square Havlíčkovo náměstí. It is lined by valuable burgher houses in the Renaissance and Baroque styles, some of them with preserved Gothic elements.

The main landmark of the square is the Old Town Hall. The originally late Gothic house from the late 15th century was reconstructed in the Renaissance style after the huge fire in 1662. In its alcove there is one of symbols of the town, a skeleton of betrayal who opened the gates to the enemy army in 1472 and was punished for it. Today the building serves as a library. For its value, it has been protected as a national cultural monument since 2024.

Opposite the Old Town Hall is the New Town Hall. The original building was built in the 13th century and later served as a brewery and military barracks. It was last reconstructed in the Neo-Baroque style in 1884 and since then houses the municipal office. The landmark of the northern part of the square is Havlíčkův House. The Renaissance and Neo-Gothic is owned by the town and houses the Vysočina Museum.

The deanery Church of the Assumption of the Virgin Mary is the oldest church in Havlíčkův Brod. The original early Gothic building from the late 13th century was built by the Teutonic Order. It was rebuilt in 1380, in 1633–1637 and last in the 18th century. The 51 metres (167 ft) high tower of the church is the main landmark of the town. The tower includes one of the oldest bells in the country, created in the 1330s. The tower is open to the public.

Štáfl Cottage is a unique folk architecture house, protected as a national cultural monument. The oldest parts of the house date from the 16th century.

== Notable people ==
- Jan František Beckovský (1658–1725), historian, writer and translator
- Ignác František Mara (1709–1783), cellist and composer
- Johann Stamitz (1717–1757), composer and violinist
- Josef Dobrovský (1753–1829), philologist and historian; studied here
- Karel Havlíček Borovský (1821–1856), writer and poet; lived here
- Bedřich Smetana (1824–1884), composer; studied here
- Karel Barvitius (1864–1937), publisher
- Václav Klofáč (1868–1942), politician
- Vilém Kurz (1872–1945), pianist
- Jan Zrzavý (1890–1977), painter; studied here
- Jan Klán (1911–1986), fighter pilot
- Karel Kuttelwascher (1916–1959), fighter pilot
- Pavel Landovský (1936–2014), actor
- Jaroslav Holík (1942–2015), ice hockey player and coach
- Jiří Holík (born 1944), ice hockey player and coach
- Jan Suchý (1944–2021), ice hockey player
- Josef Augusta (1946–2017), ice hockey player and coach
- Miroslav Jakeš (1951–2026), polar explorer and mountaineer
- František Janák (born 1951), glass artist
- Pavel Poc (born 1964), politician
- Regina Rajchrtová (born 1968), tennis player
- Lenka Šmídová (born 1975), sailor, Olympic medalist
- Josef Marha (born 1976), ice hockey player
- Radek Martínek (born 1976), ice hockey player
- Petr Zelenka (born 1976), serial killer
- Jan Novák (born 1979), ice hockey player
- Tomáš Zdechovský (born 1979), politician
- Josef Vašíček (1980–2011), ice hockey player
- Antonín Dušek (born 1986), ice hockey player
- Marika Šoposká (born 1989), actress
- Hynek Zohorna (born 1990), ice hockey player
- Tomáš Souček (born 1995), footballer
- Radim Zohorna (born 1996), ice hockey player
- Vítek Vaněček (born 1996), ice hockey player
- Radim Mrtka (born 2007), ice hockey player

== Twin towns – sister cities ==
Havlíčkův Brod is twinned with:

- Brielle, Netherlands
- Brixen, Italy
- Spišská Nová Ves, Slovakia

Havlíčkův Brod also cooperates with other Brods in the Czech Republic: Český Brod, Uherský Brod, Vyšší Brod and Železný Brod.

== Gallery ==
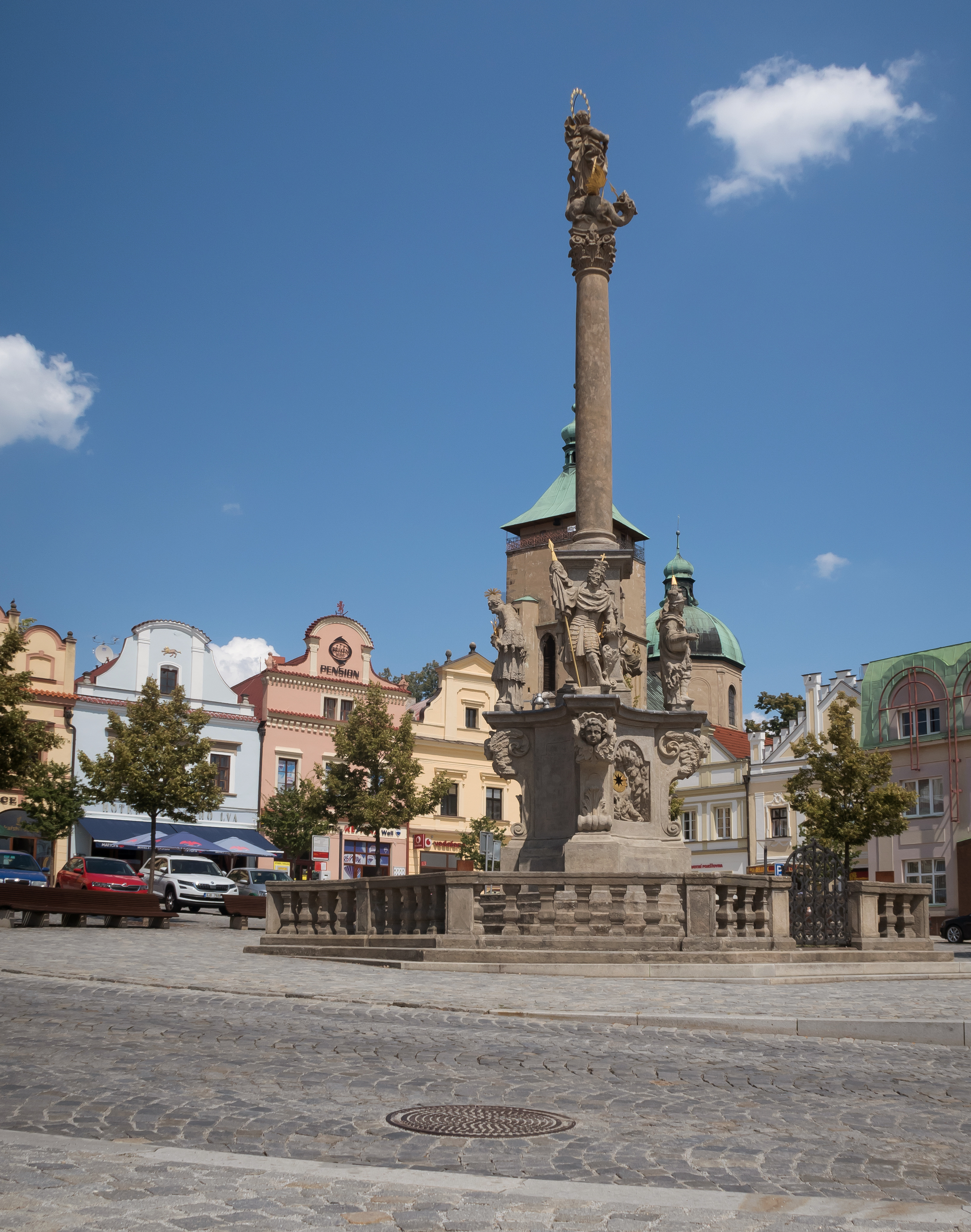
Marian column at the Havlíčkovo náměstí

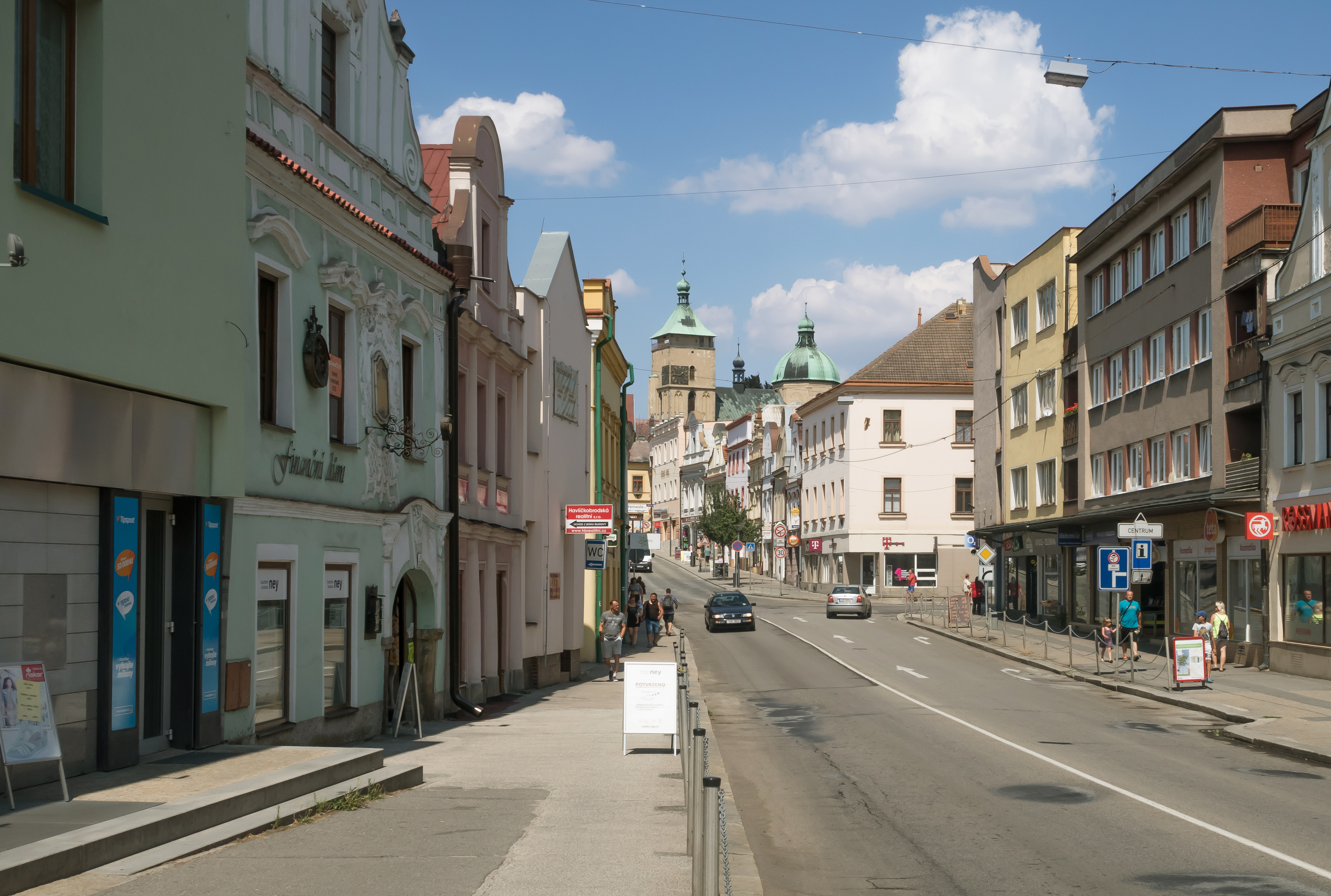
Dolní street

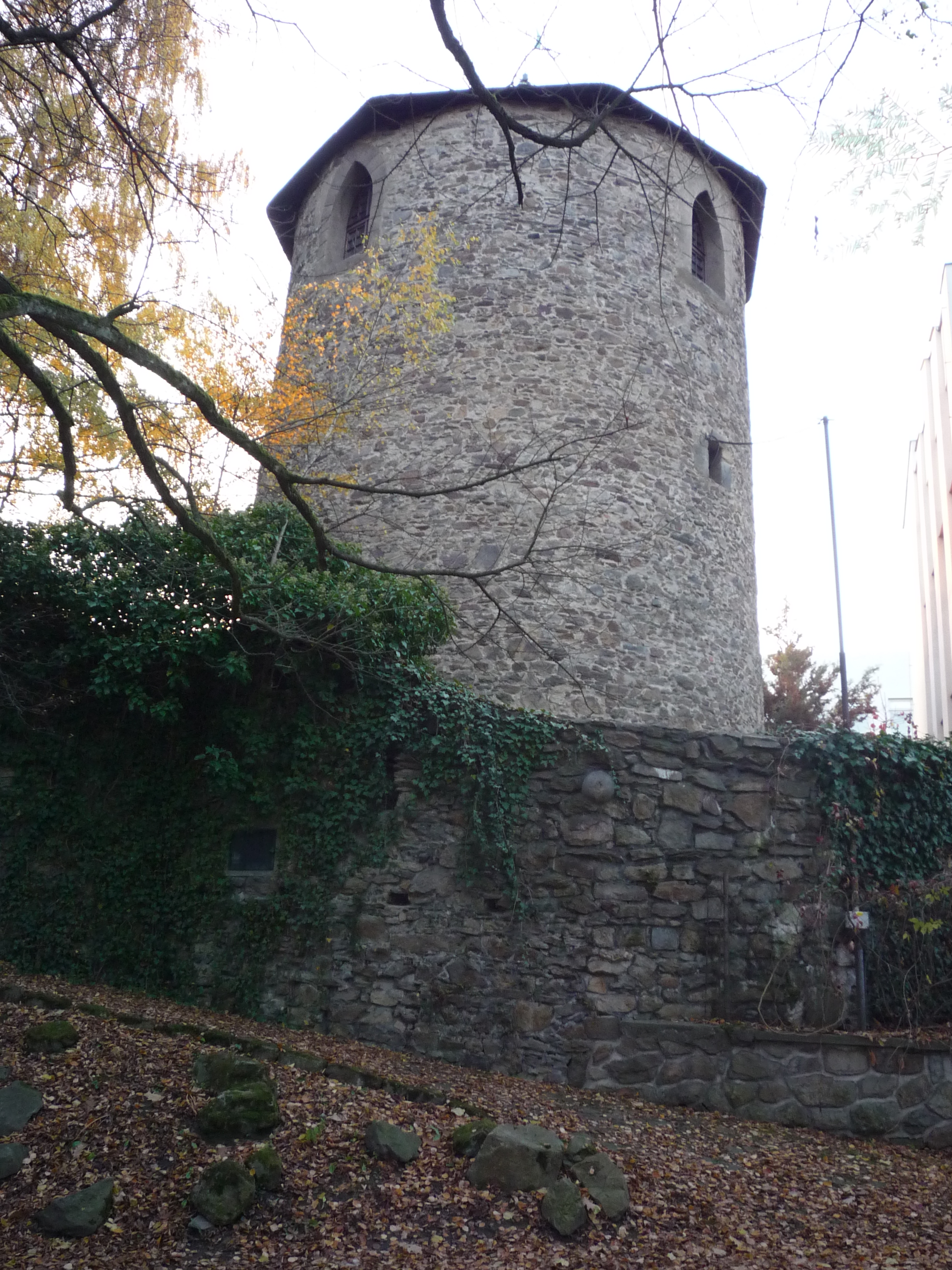
Remains of the town fortifications

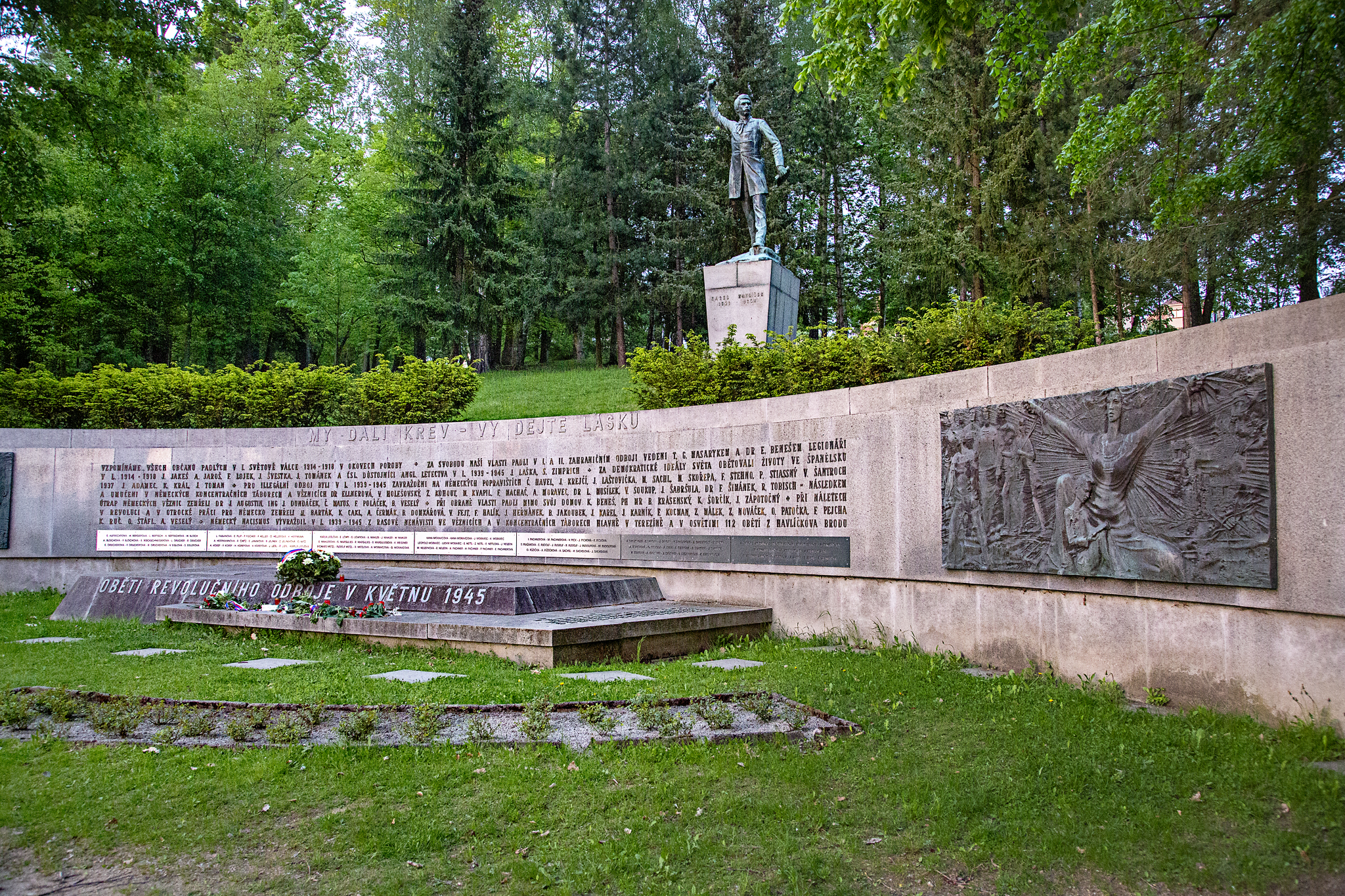
Memorial to Karel Havlíček Borovský and Memorial to the Victims of World Wars
