= Sloupno =

Sloupno may refer to places in the Czech Republic:

- Sloupno (Havlíčkův Brod District), a municipality and village in the Vysočina Region
- Sloupno (Hradec Králové District), a municipality and village in the Hradec Králové Region
