= Sloupno (Havlíčkův Brod District) =

- Municipality
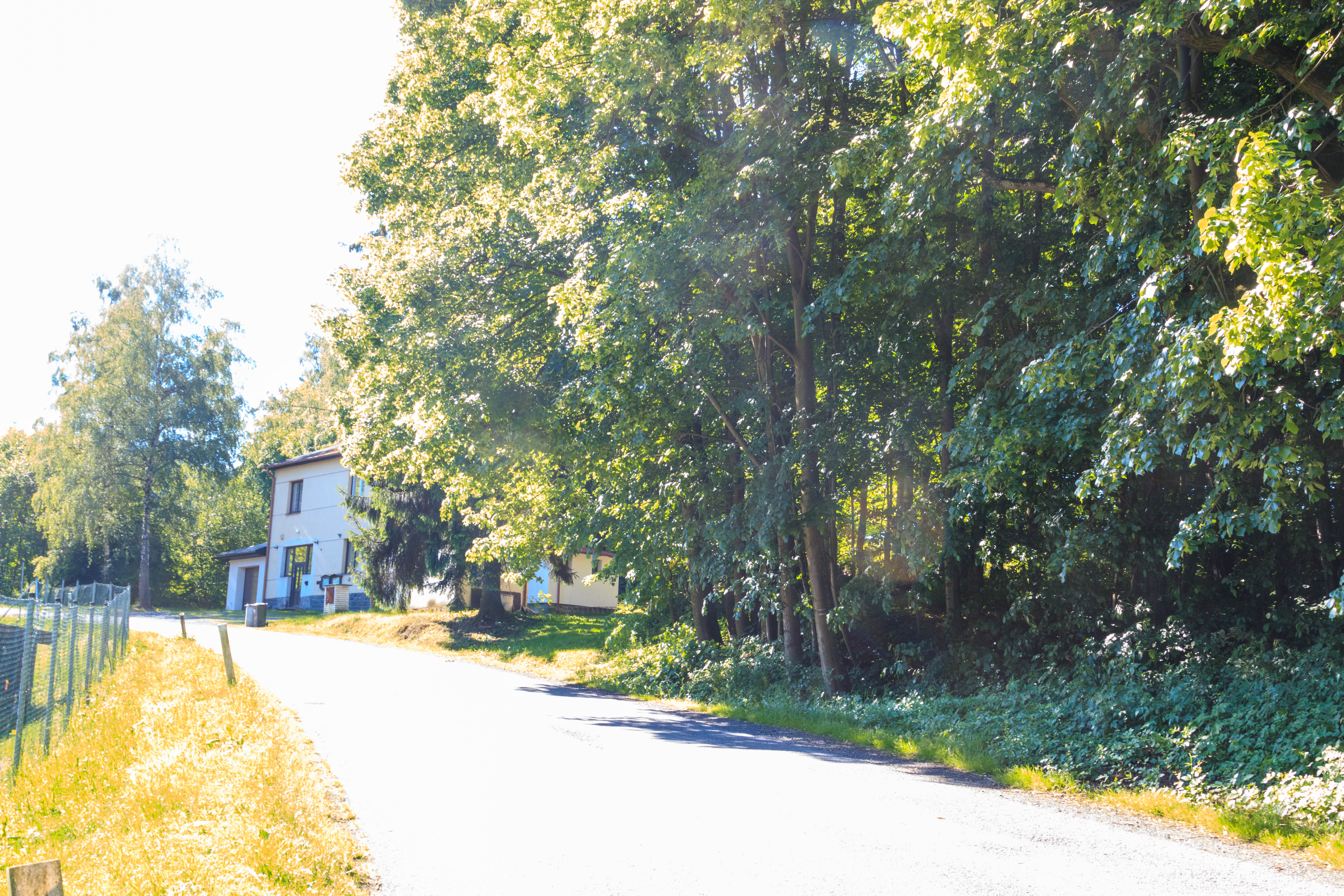
- Municipal office by the main road

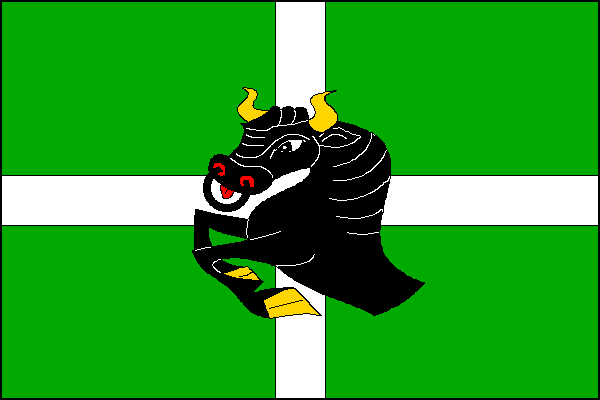
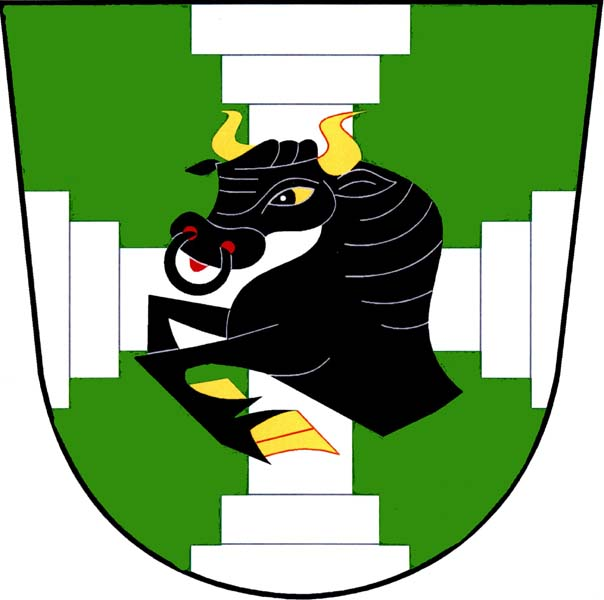
- Flag Coat of arms

- Location in the Czech Republic
- Coordinates: 49°44′13″N 15°44′59″E
- Country: Czech Republic
- Region: Vysočina
- District: Havlíčkův Brod
- First mentioned: 1556

Area
  - Total: 1.86 km^{2} (0.72 sq mi)
- Elevation: 484 m (1,588 ft)

Population (2026-01-01)
  - Total: 44
  - Density: 24/km^{2} (61/sq mi)
- Time zone: UTC+1 (CET)
  - Summer (DST): UTC+2 (CEST)
- Postal code: 583 01
- Website: obec-sloupno.cz

Sloupno is a municipality and village in Havlíčkův Brod District in the Vysočina Region of the Czech Republic. It has about 40 inhabitants.

Sloupno lies approximately 20 kilometres (12 mi) north-east of Havlíčkův Brod, 40 km (25 mi) north of Jihlava, and 103 km (64 mi) east of Prague.

== Demographics ==
Historical population
Year	Pop.	±%
1869	143	—
1880	118	−17.5%
1890	126	+6.8%
1900	161	+27.8%
1910	166	+3.1%
1921	173	+4.2%
1930	149	−13.9%
1950	117	−21.5%
1961	113	−3.4%
1970	102	−9.7%
1980	81	−20.6%
1991	55	−32.1%
2001	44	−20.0%
2011	51	+15.9%
2021	41	−19.6%
Source: Censuses
