= Slavnic =

Slavnic can refer to:

- Slavníč, a small village in the Czech Republic
- Zoran Slavnić, a retired Serbian basketball player and coach
