= Slavníč =

- Municipality
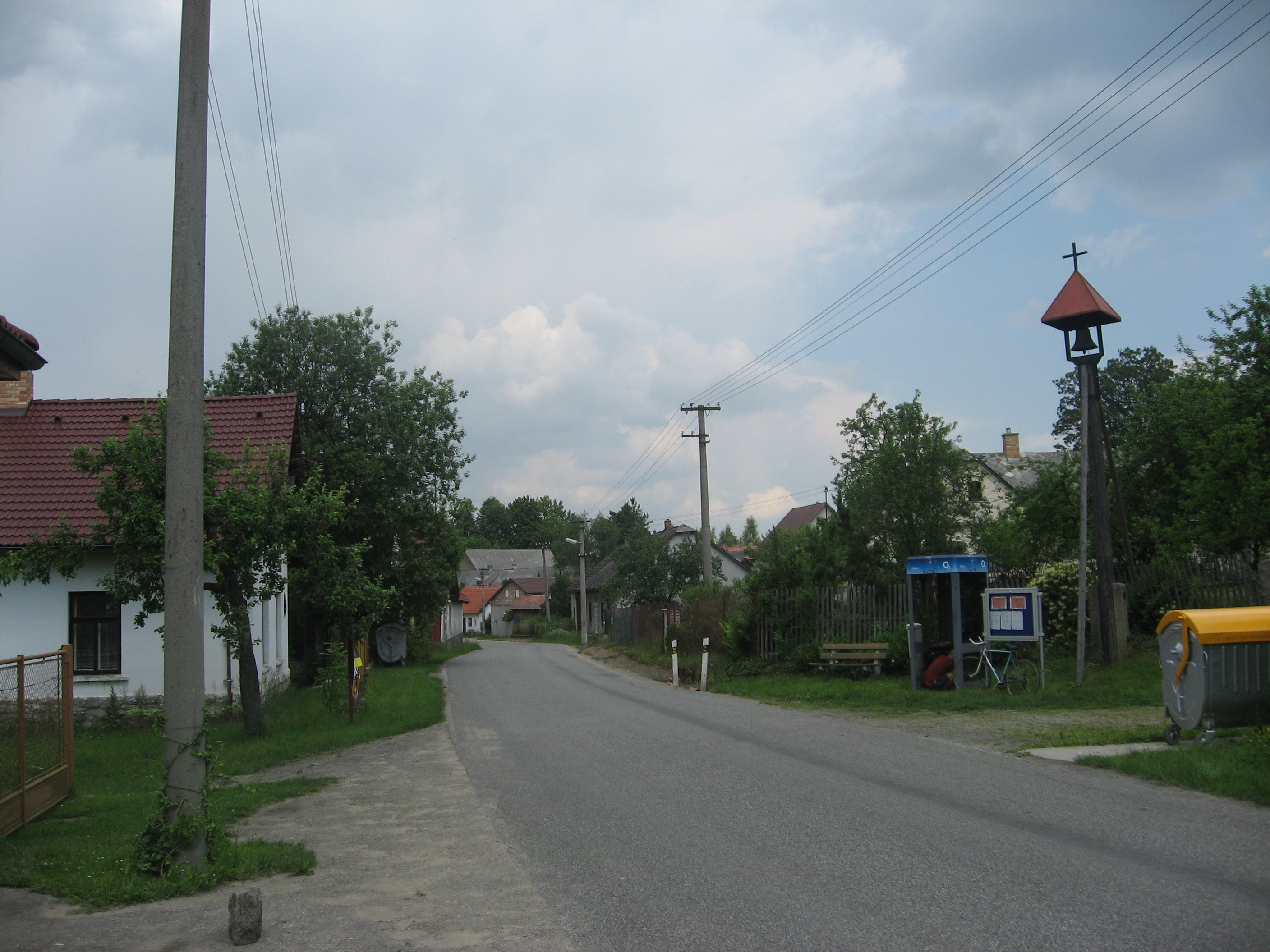
- Centre of Slavníč

- Location in the Czech Republic
- Coordinates: 49°30′53″N 15°27′8″E
- Country: Czech Republic
- Region: Vysočina
- District: Havlíčkův Brod
- First mentioned: 1226

Area
  - Total: 2.14 km^{2} (0.83 sq mi)
- Elevation: 544 m (1,785 ft)

Population (2026-01-01)
  - Total: 69
  - Density: 32/km^{2} (84/sq mi)
- Time zone: UTC+1 (CET)
  - Summer (DST): UTC+2 (CEST)
- Postal code: 582 55
- Website: www.slavnic.cz

Slavníč is a municipality and village in Havlíčkův Brod District in the Vysočina Region of the Czech Republic. It has about 70 inhabitants.

== Demographics ==
Historical population
Year	Pop.	±%
1869	269	—
1880	286	+6.3%
1890	255	−10.8%
1900	250	−2.0%
1910	205	−18.0%
1921	204	−0.5%
1930	215	+5.4%
1950	158	−26.5%
1961	118	−25.3%
1970	88	−25.4%
1980	62	−29.5%
1991	53	−14.5%
2001	40	−24.5%
2011	60	+50.0%
2021	67	+11.7%
Source: Censuses

== Transport ==
The D1 motorway from Prague to Brno runs through the municipality.
