= Czech Baroque architecture =

Architectural period in Czech Republic

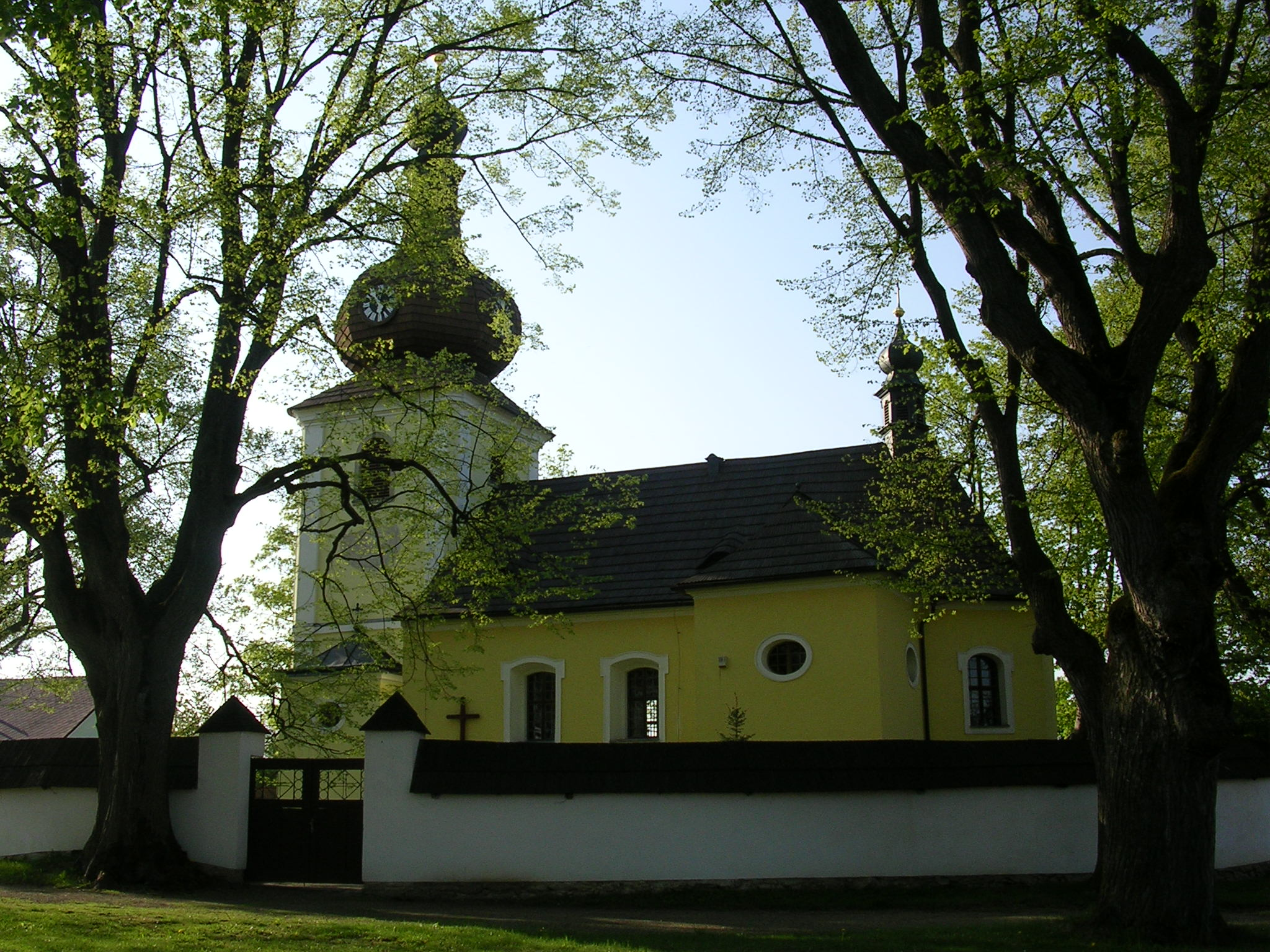
Typical Baroque church in the Czech countryside (Church of St. Nicholas, Častrov).

Czech Baroque architecture refers to the architectural period of the 17th and 18th century in Bohemia, Moravia and Silesia, which comprised the Crown of Bohemia and today constitute the Czech Republic.

The Baroque style also changed the character of the Czech countryside (churches and chapels in Czech countryside are mostly Baroque). Czech Baroque architecture is considered to be a unique part of the European cultural heritage thanks to its extensiveness and extraordinariness. In the first third of the 18th century the Czech lands (especially Bohemia) were one of the leading artistic centers of the Baroque style. In Bohemia there was completed in a very original way the development of the Radical Baroque style created in Italy by Francesco Borromini and Guarino Guarini. The leading architects of the Czech High Baroque style (also called Radical Baroque of Bohemia) were Christoph Dientzenhofer, Kilian Ignaz Dientzenhofer and Jan Blažej Santini-Aichel.

The spread of Baroque architecture in the Crown of Bohemia was coupled with the victory of the Catholic Church during the Thirty Years' War when the Catholic Church became the only legal church in the Kingdom of Bohemia (from 1627) and Margraviate of Moravia (from 1628). The heyday of Baroque style in the Czech lands can be seen in the early 18th century.

Many of the Baroque architects who worked, lived and often also died in the Czech lands came from different countries or were of foreign origin, mainly Italian, some came also from Bavaria, Austria or France.

== From Late Renaissance and Mannerism to Early Baroque ==
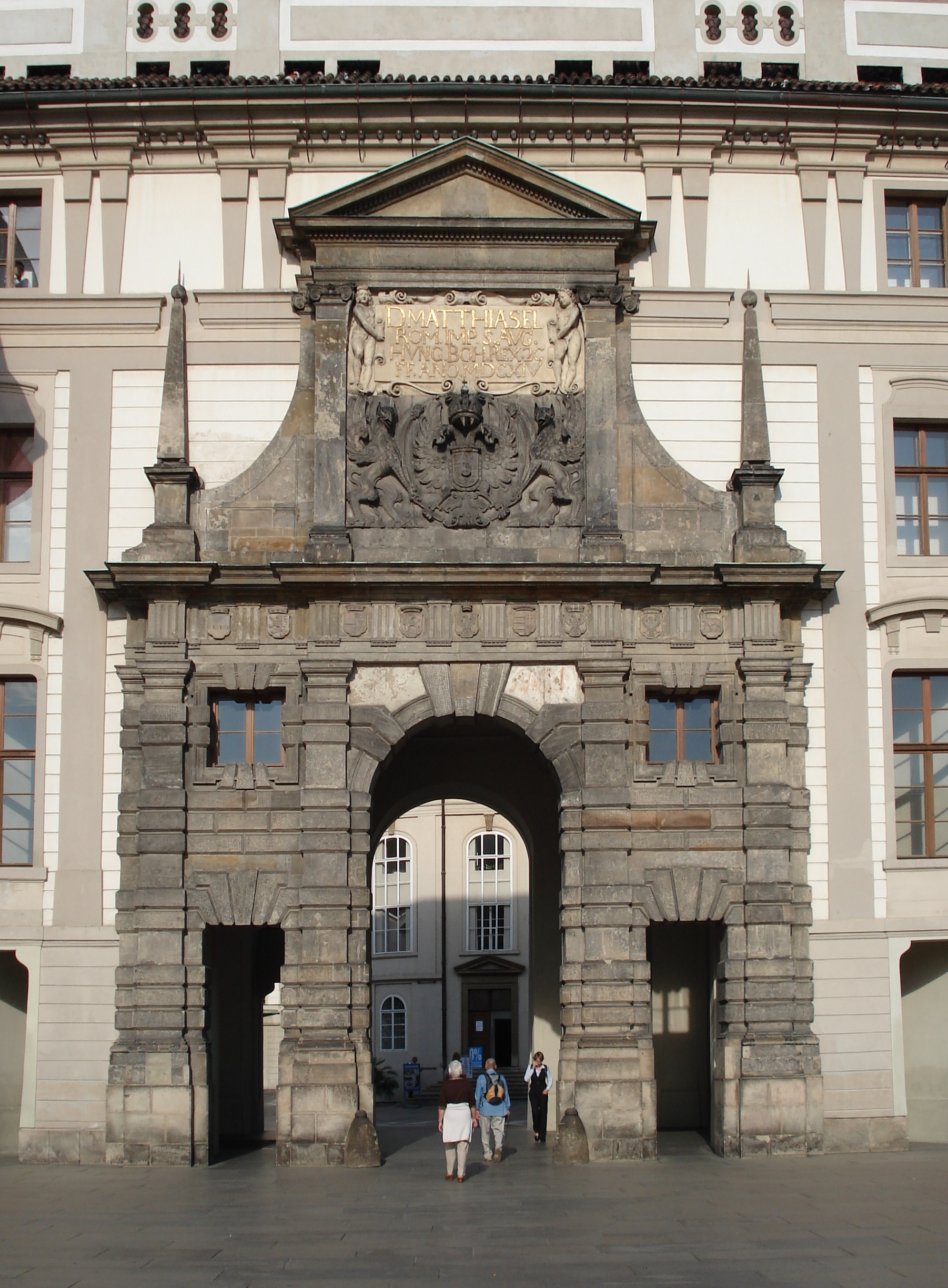
The Matthias Gate at the Prague Castle, probably the first Baroque structure in Bohemia.

The Baroque style penetrated Bohemia in the first half of the 17th century. Prague was one of the main centers of Mannerist art (a late Renaissance style, foreseeing early Baroque) under Rudolph II (1576–1611). At the end of his reign and during the reign of his brother Mathias (1611–1619) there were built some late Renaissance or Mannerist buildings with Early Baroque elements in Prague. But it is hard to distinguish between the Mannerist style and the Early Baroque style because there is no clear break, therefore some scholars consider these buildings to be Early Baroque while others consider them to be Mannerist.

Among these transitional buildings is the Italian chapel consecrated to the Assumption of the Virgin Mary, adjoining the former Jesuit college called Clementinum built in 1590-1600 for Italians residing in Prague, designed by the Italian O. Mascarino. Although it is a Late Renaissance or Mannerist chapel, it is very important for Czech Baroque architecture because of its elliptical ground plan which is much more typical for Baroque architecture than for the rational Renaissance style.

The Matthias Gate of the Prague Castle, built before 1614 probably by Giovanni Maria Filippi is traditionally designated the first Baroque structure in Prague.

== Early Baroque ==
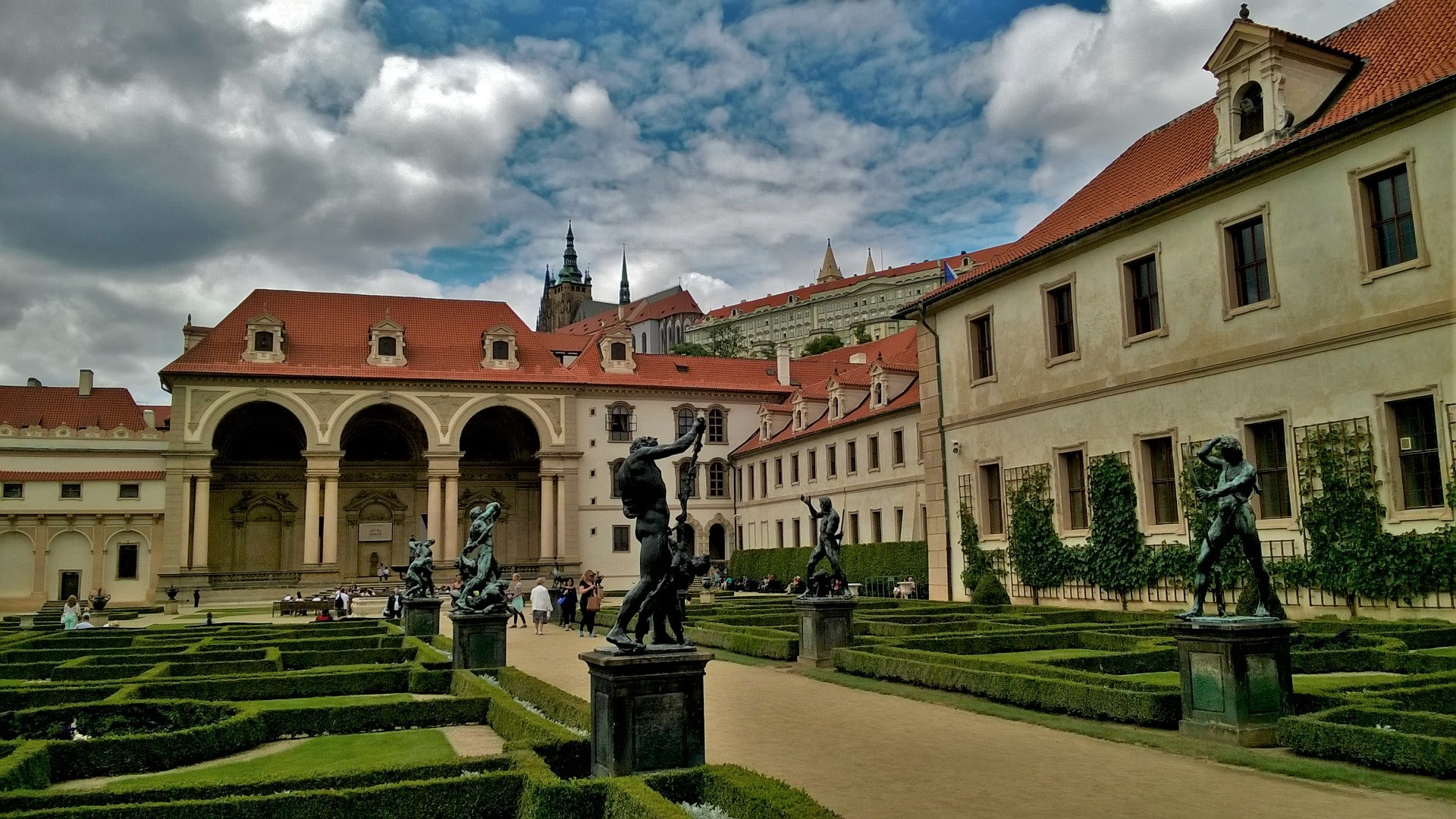
Wallenstein Palace, the first Baroque palace in Central Europe.

The clear Baroque style came to the Crown of Bohemia during the Thirty Years' War (1618–1648) when it finally replaced the Renaissance style. The Baroque style, coming from Catholic Italy, was strongly supported by the rich Catholic aristocracy and the Catholic church.

The architects of early Baroque in the Czech lands were foreigners, mostly Italians.

The first Baroque palace in Prague and probably also the first in Central Europe was built in 1621–1630 for a Czech nobleman, general of the imperial army in the Thirty Years' War, Albrecht von Wallenstein. Wallenstein Palace (Czech: Valdštejnský palác) was designed and built by Italian architects Giovanni de Galliano Pieroni and Andrea Spezza and was inspired by the newest Italian architecture of its time but the influence of Mannerism can also be seen.

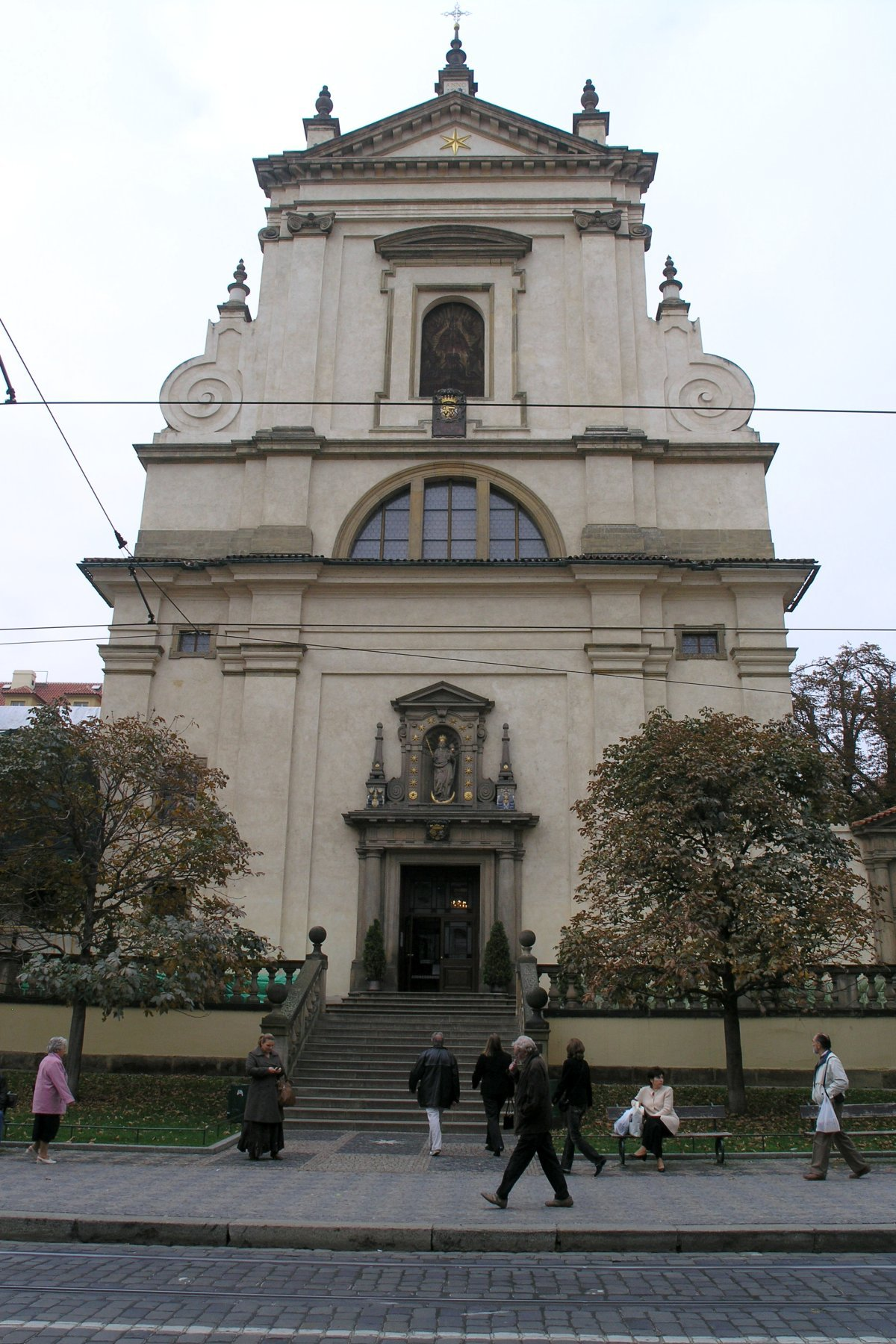
Facade of the Church of Our Lady Victorious completed in 1644

The Church of Our Lady Victorious in the Lesser Town of Prague is considered to be the first Baroque church in Prague. It was built probably by Giovanni Maria Filippi in 1611–13 for Lutherans in the late Renaissance style. In the 1620s the church became Catholic and was rebuilt in the early Baroque style. The new Baroque façade was completed in 1644.

Very important architect of the early Baroque style in Prague was Carlo Lurago, who came from Italy and worked for the Jesuits. He started to rebuild the Clementinum and the older Renaissance St. Salvator Church in the Old Town, and for the Jesuits he built St. Ignatius Church on Charles Square in the New Town and the Church in Březnice. He built the Humprecht Chateau in 1666-1668 with an interesting elliptical ground floor. Another Italian architect who settled in the Czech lands was Francesco Carrati, who designed the Černín Palace in Prague.

In the early Baroque style was renovated the residence of the archbishops of Olomouc in Kroměříž by Italian-Swiss architect Filiberto Lucchese and then by Italian Giovanni Pietro Tencalla. The Kroměříž Archbishop's Palace has been added to the UNESCO World Heritage List.

Jean Baptiste Mathey was an important French architect who worked in the Crown of Bohemia. His works include the Church of St. Francis Seraph in the Old Town of Prague and Troja Palace, built near Prague for the counts of Sternberg. He also rebuilt the Archbishop's Palace in Prague. His works prefigure the High Baroque style in the Czech lands.

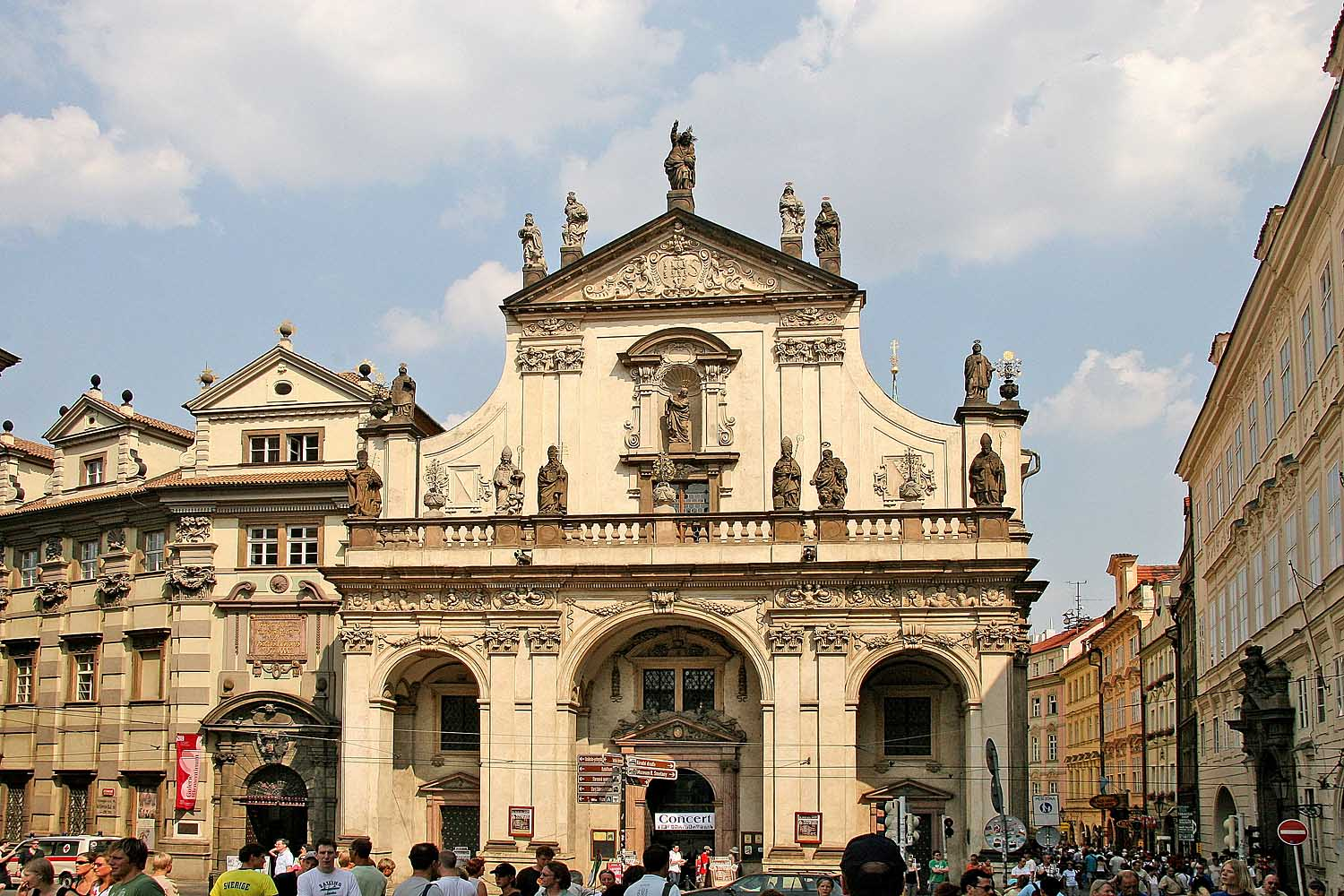
The front facade of the Church of the Holy Savior by Carlo Lurago, 1650s–1660s.

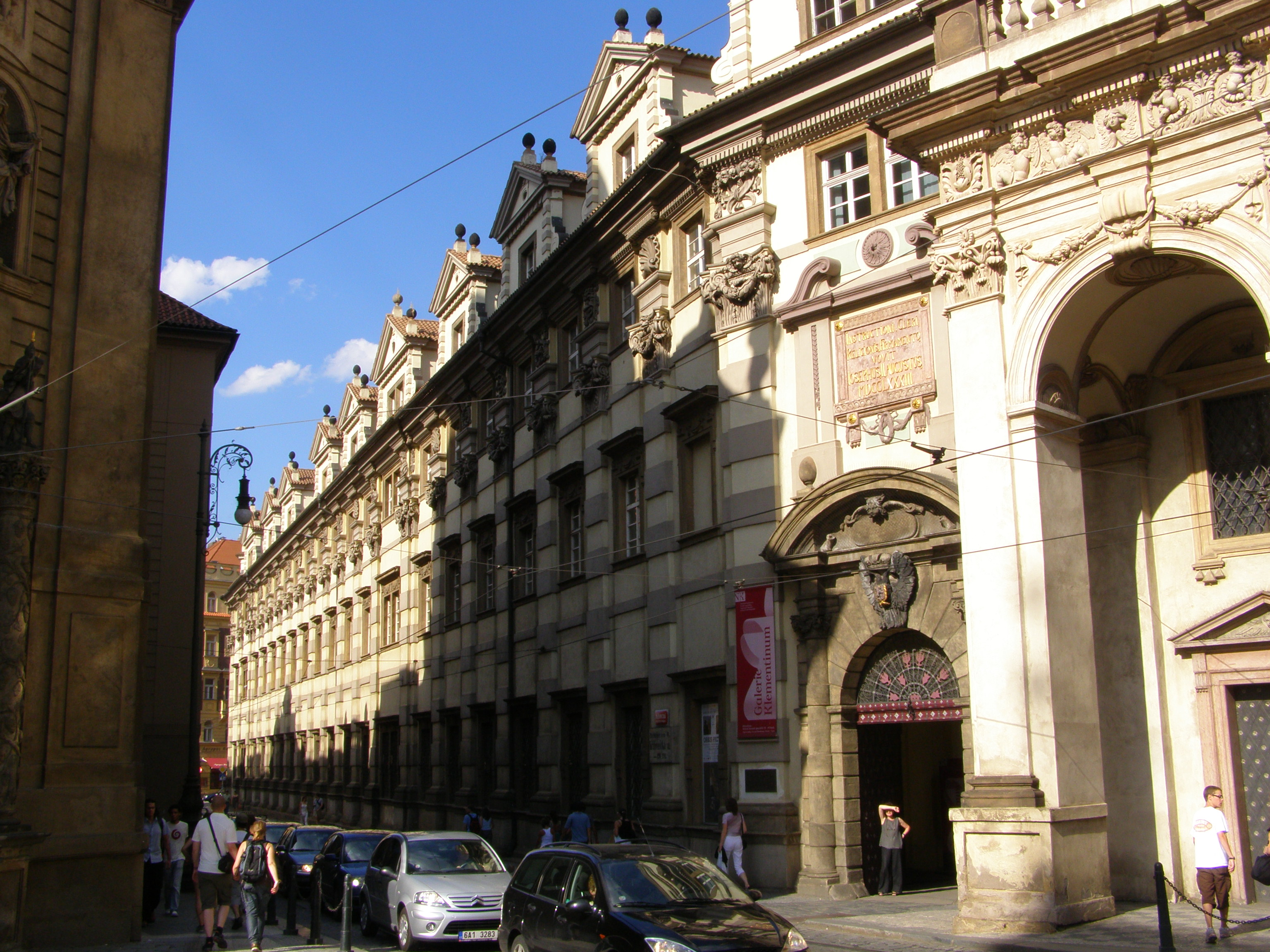
The front facade of Clementinum by Carlo Lurago, 1650s–1660s.

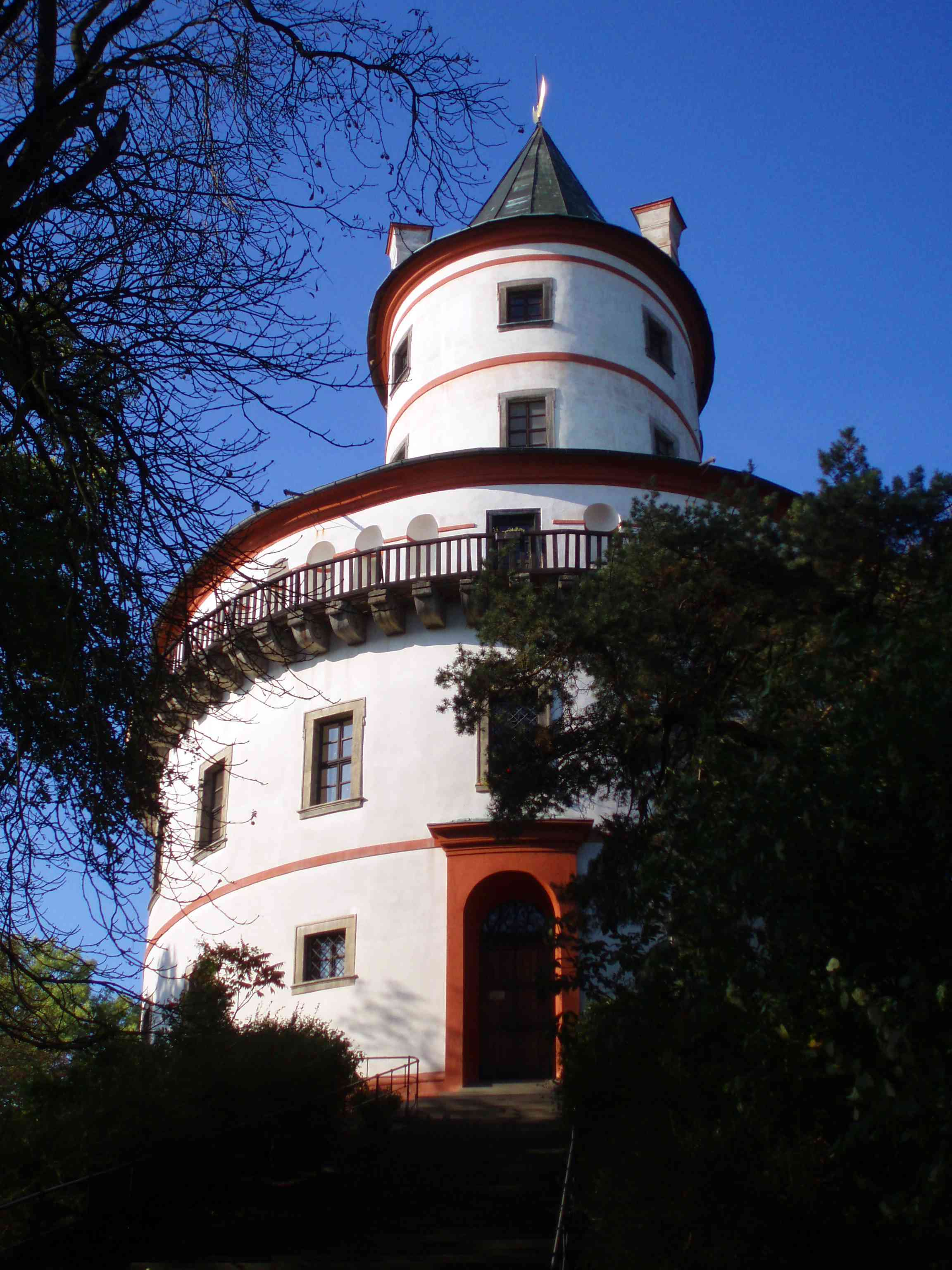
The Humprecht Chateau by Carlo Lurago, 1666–1668.

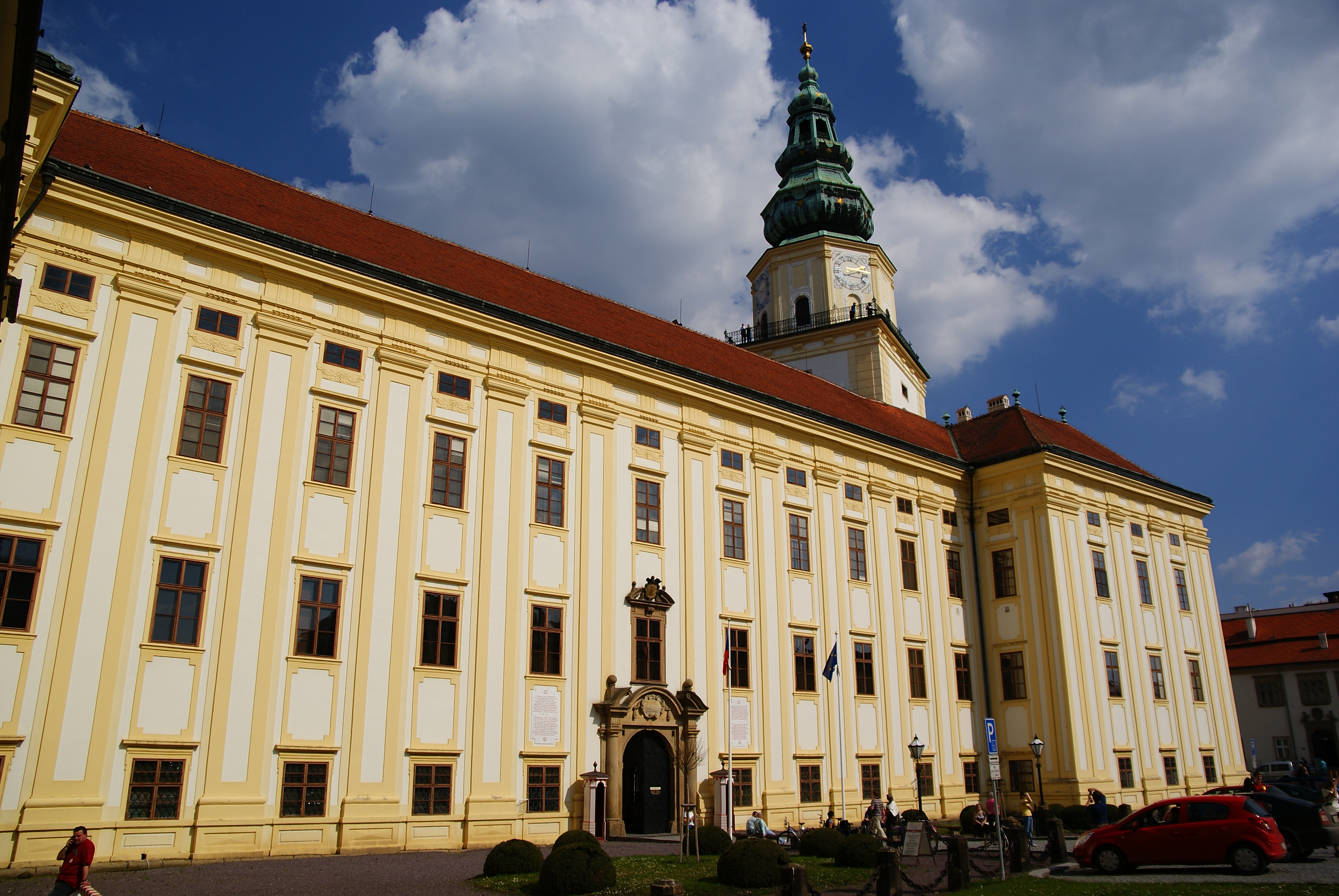
Kroměříž Archbishop's Palace by Filiberto Lucchese, 1660s.

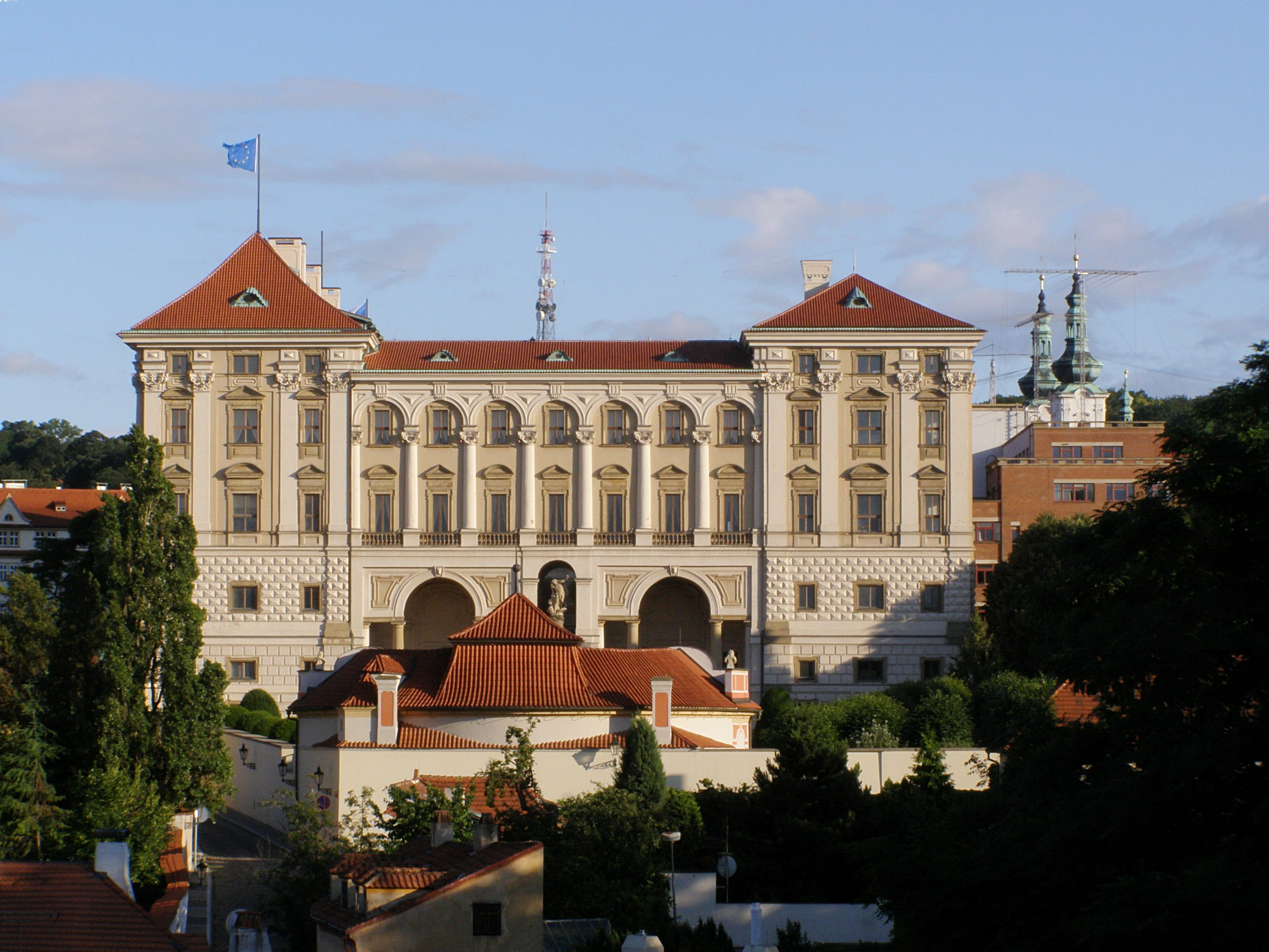
Czernin Palace by Francesco Caratti, 1660s–1680s.

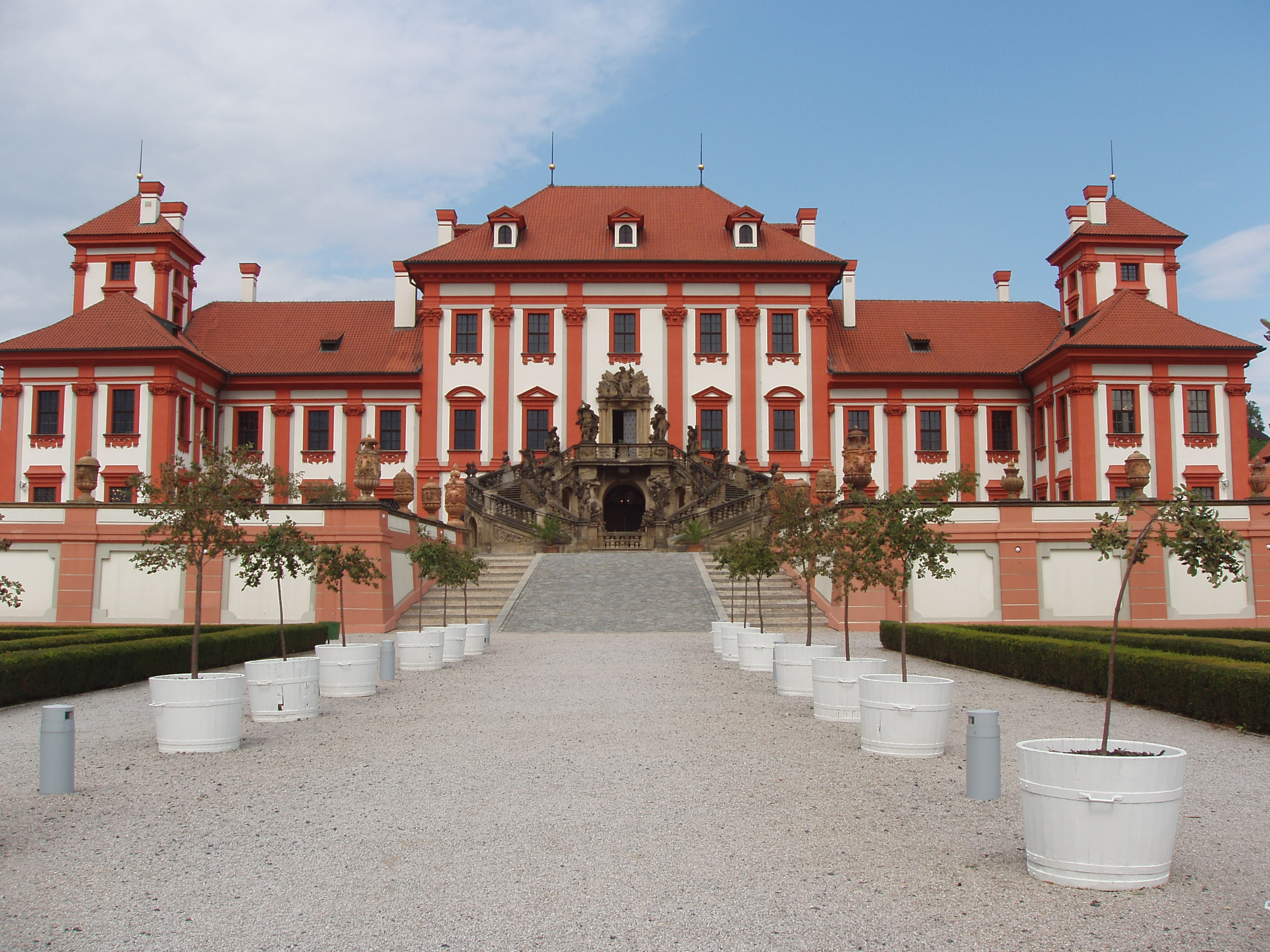
Troja Palace by Jean Baptiste Mathey, 1679–1685.

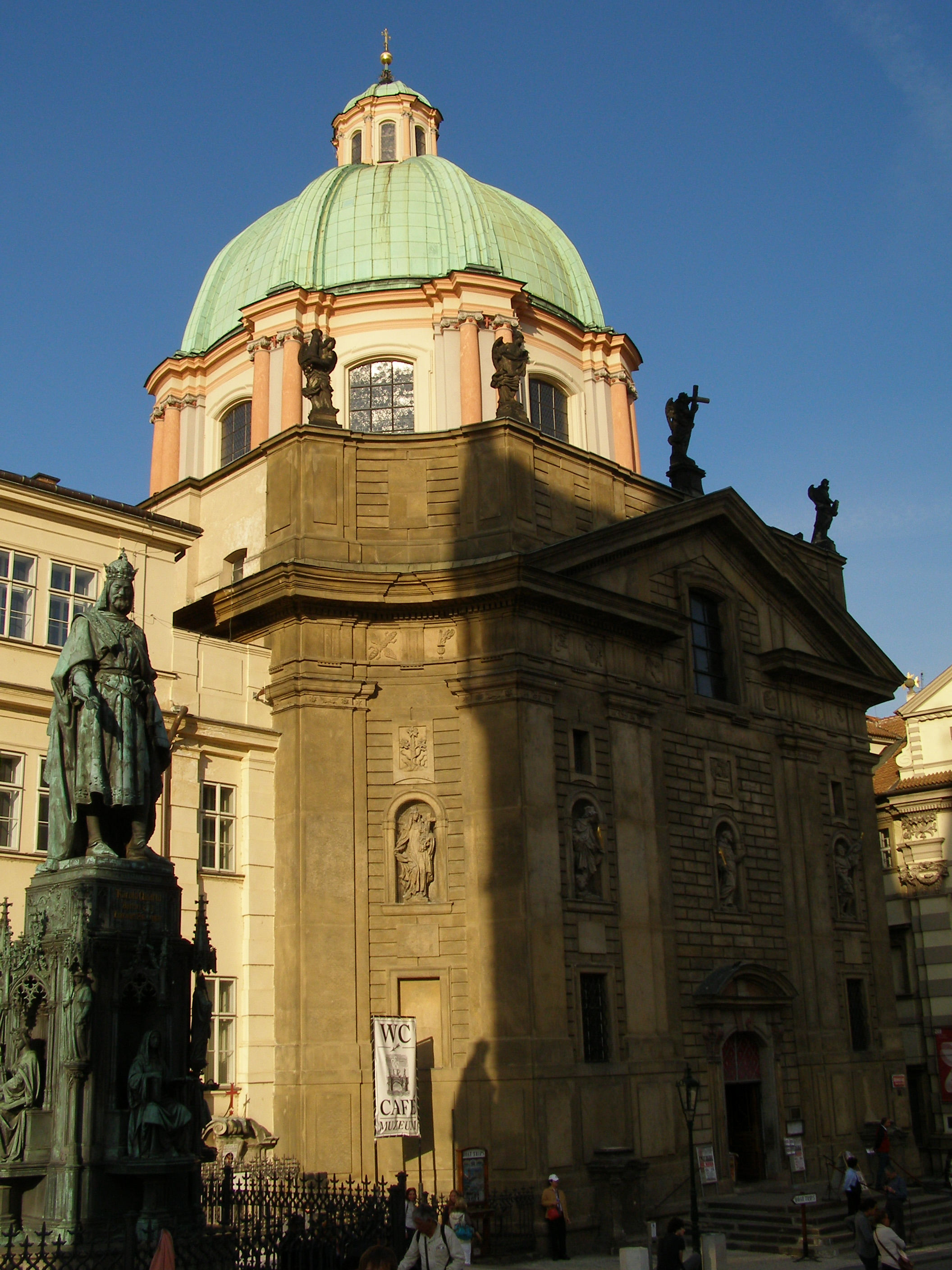
Church of St. Francis Seraph in the Old Town of Prague by Jean Baptiste Mathey, 1679–1688.

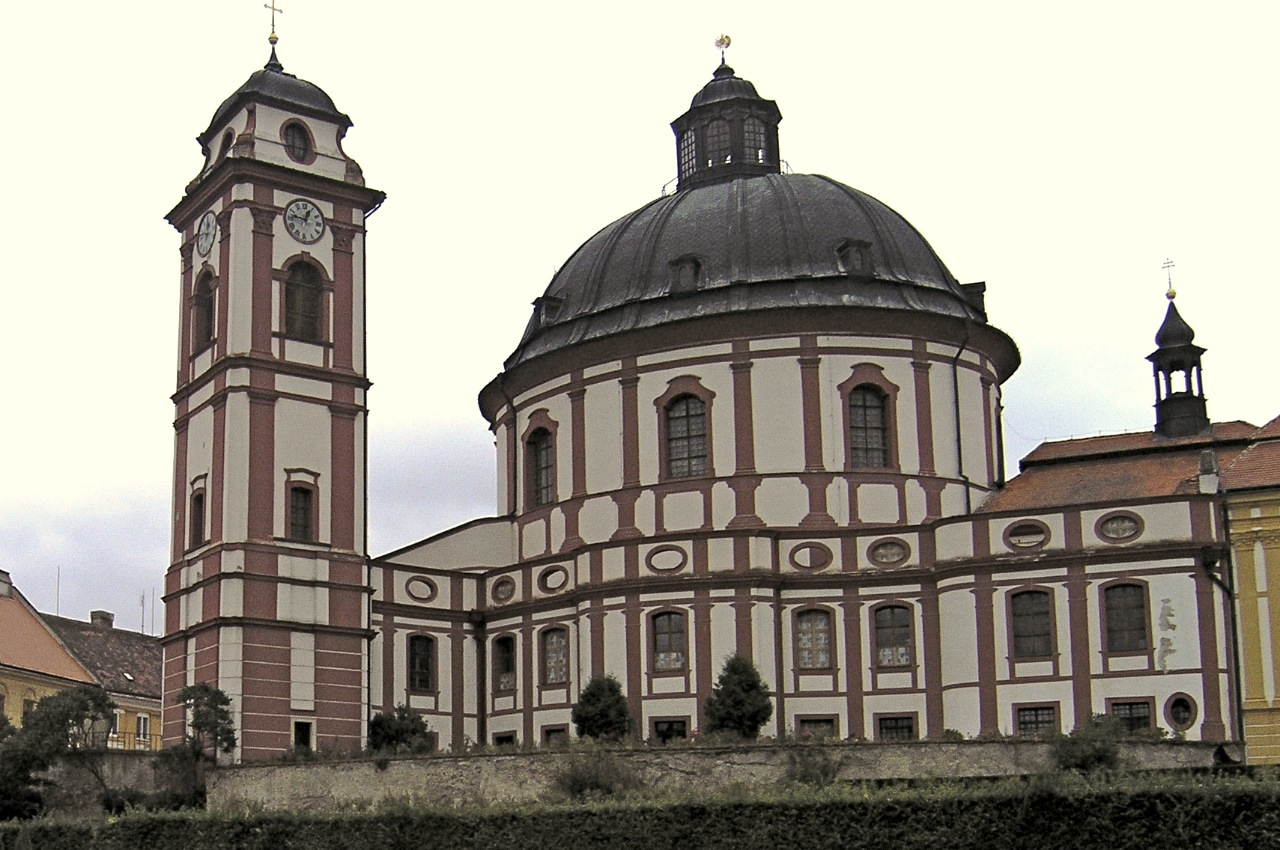
Church of St. Margaret in Jaroměřice nad Rokytnou, late 17th century.

== High Baroque ==
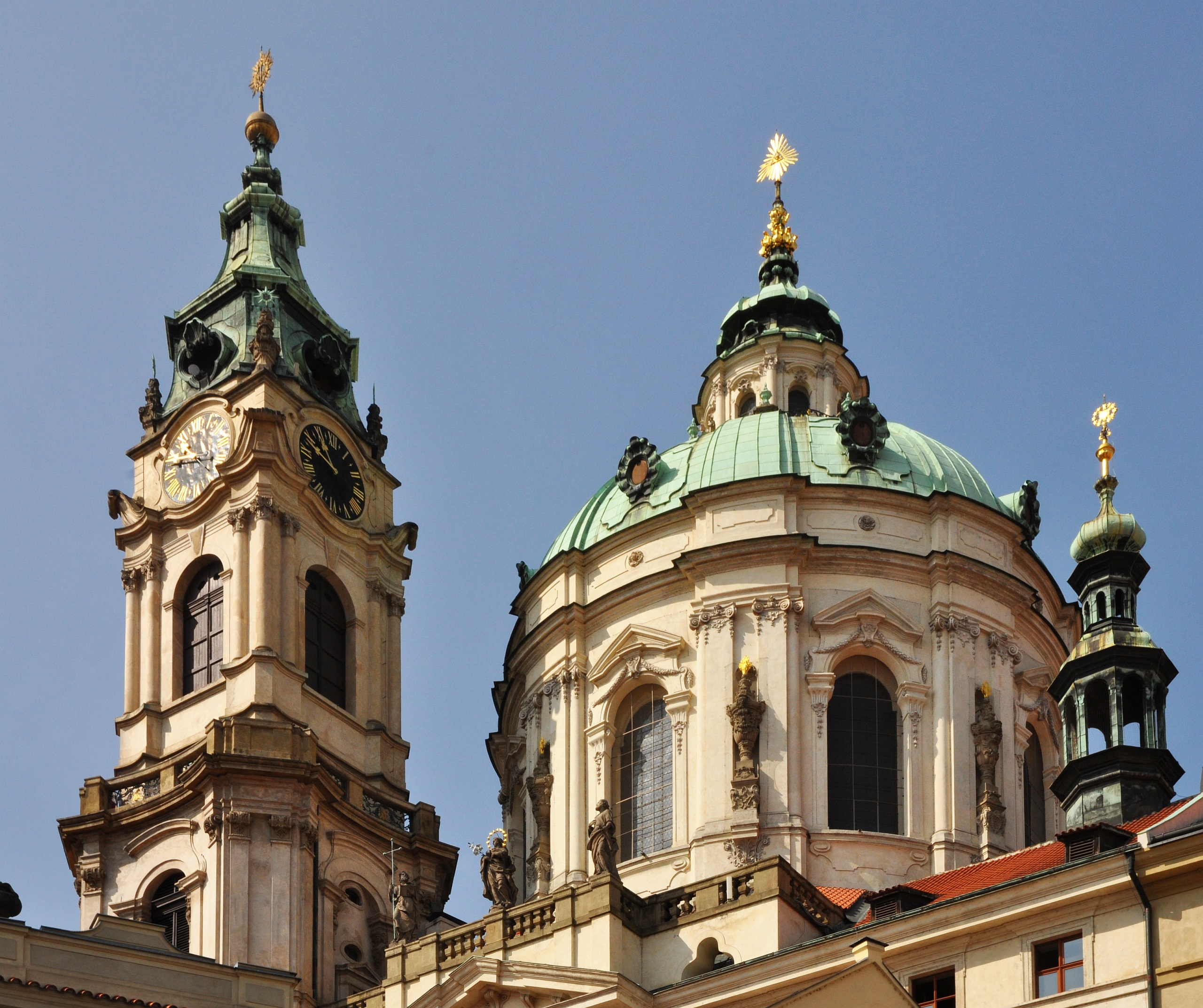
St. Nicholas Church in Prague, built in the first half of the 18th century in the radical Baroque style

The High Baroque period in the Czech lands begins around the year 1690 and lasts to the mid-18th century. The architects of this time were mostly born in Bohemia or Moravia but often were of foreign origin. The most significant architects of this period were Christoph Dientzenhofer, who came to Bohemia from Bavaria and lived in Prague, and his son Kilian Ignaz Dientzenhofer. They are known for their style called "radical Baroque", which was inspired by examples from northern Italy, particularly by the works of Guarino Guarini, and which seeks to express movement. It is characterized by the curvature of walls and intersection of oval spaces. Together, father and son Dientzenhofer built in 1702–1715 and 1737–1751 the St. Nicholas Church in the Lesser Town of Prague, due to its architecture one of the most important Baroque churches in Europe.

Other important high Baroque architects in the Crown of Bohemia were Giovanni Battista Alliprandi, born in Italy, worked mainly for aristocracy, František Maxmilián Kaňka and Jan Santini Aichel. Significant are mainly Santinis pilgrimage churches Church of the Name of the Virgin Mary (Křtiny) an Pilgrimage Church of Saint John of Nepomuk in Žďár nad Sázavou and the convent church in Rajhrad.

One of the most precious high Baroque secular buildings in Prague is the Clam-Gallas Palace built in 1714-1718 by famous Austrian architect Johann Bernhard Fischer von Erlach who also designed the Baroque rebuilding of Vranov nad Dyjí Chateau in Moravia and the Parnas fountain in Brno.

In Prague there are also fine high Baroque terraced palace gardens below the Prague Castle in the Malá Strana of Prague: Ledebur Garden, Small and Great Palffy Gardens, Kolowrat and Small Fürstenberg Gardens. Another important terraced garden in the Malá Strana district is the Vrtba Garden.

In 1714–1754 the Holy Trinity Column in Olomouc was built by Wenzel Render and other citizens of Olomouc. It too is listed on the UNESCO World Heritage List.

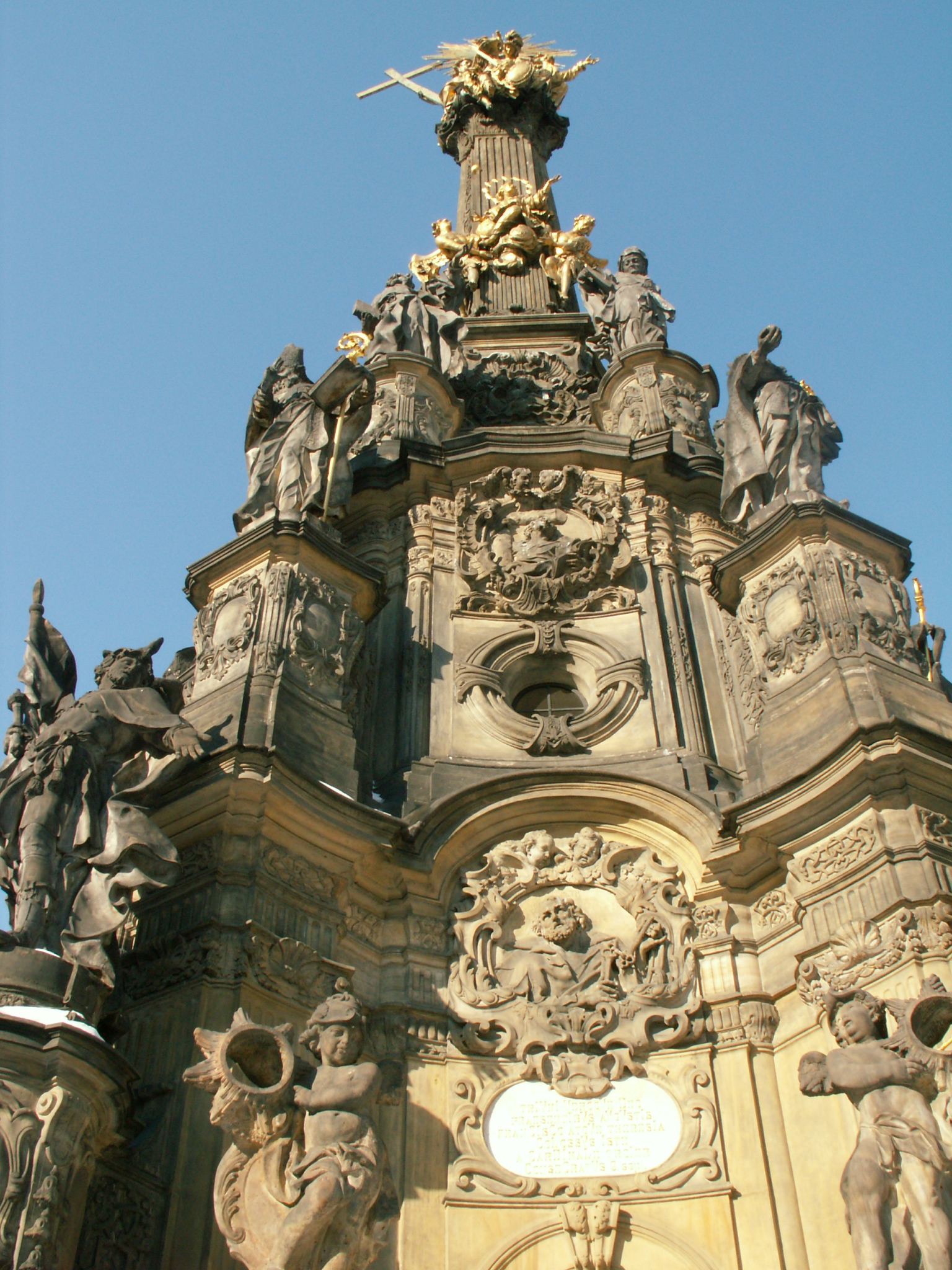
Holy Trinity Column in Olomouc

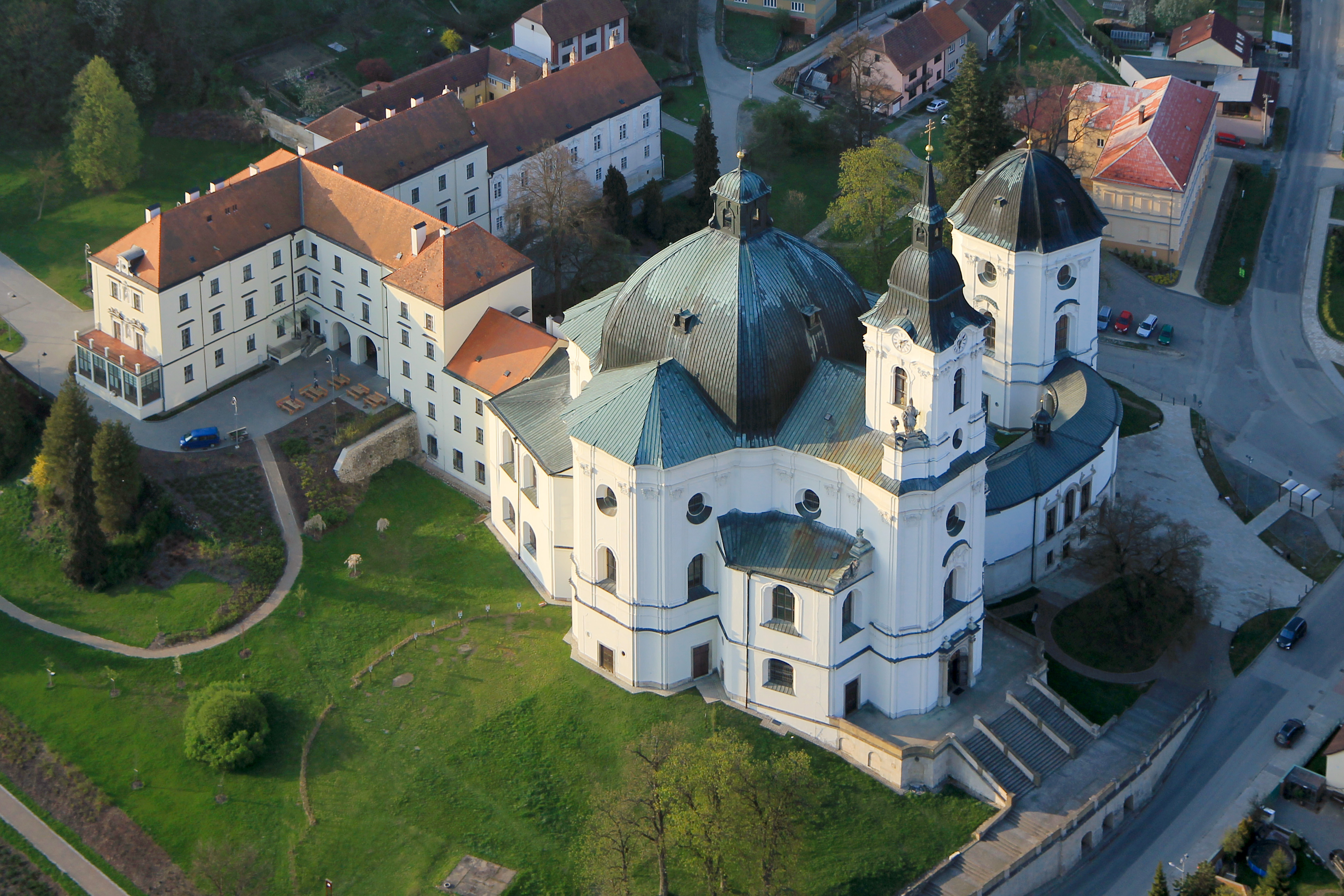
The iconic radical baroque space - Church of the Name of the Virgin Mary (Křtiny), Moravia

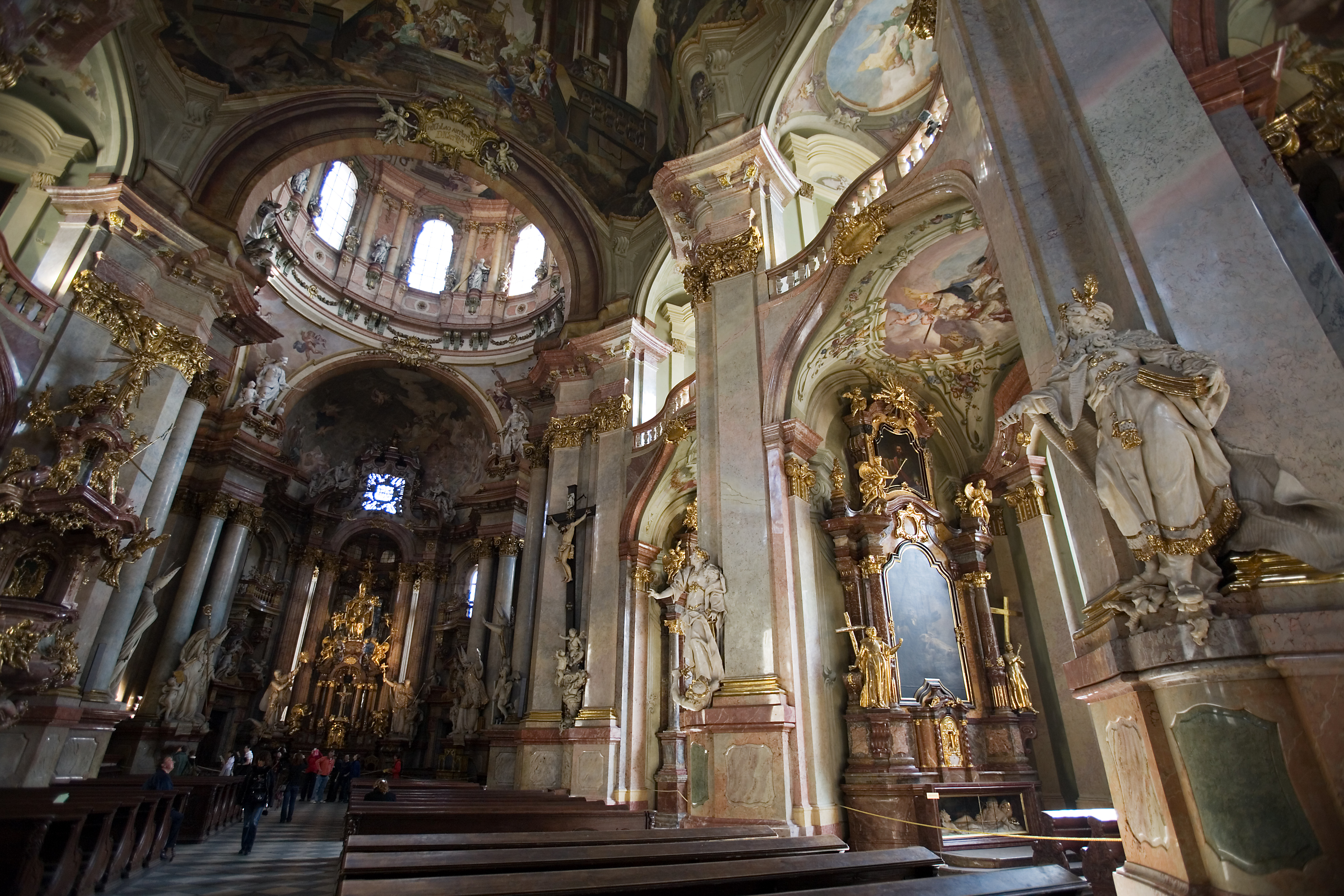
The interior of St. Nicholas Church in the Lesser Town of Prague, 1750s–1760s

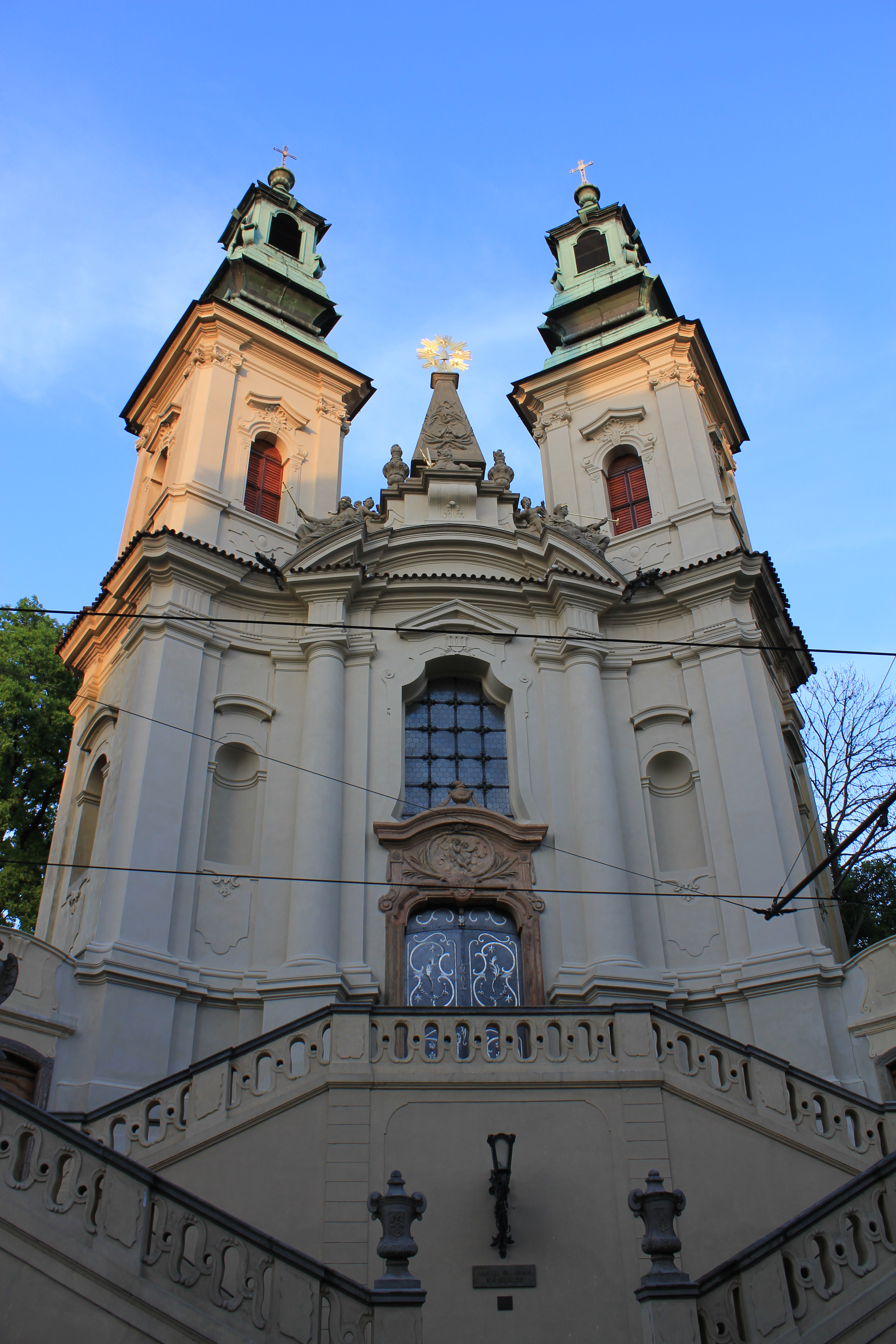
Church of St. John of Nepomuk in the New Town of Prague by Kilian Ignaz Dientzenhofer, 1730s

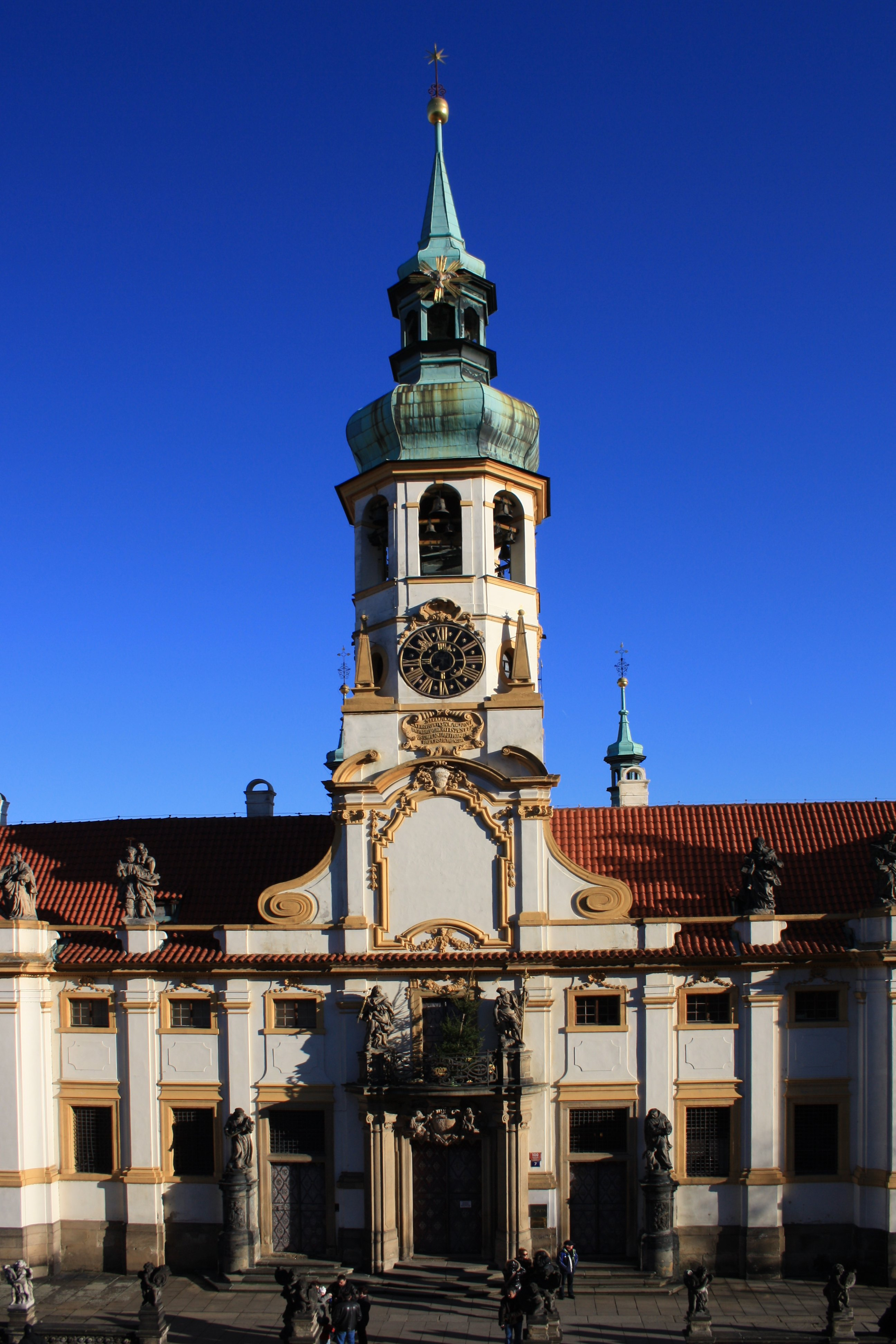
The front wall of Loreta in Prague by father and son Dientzenhofer, 1666–1668

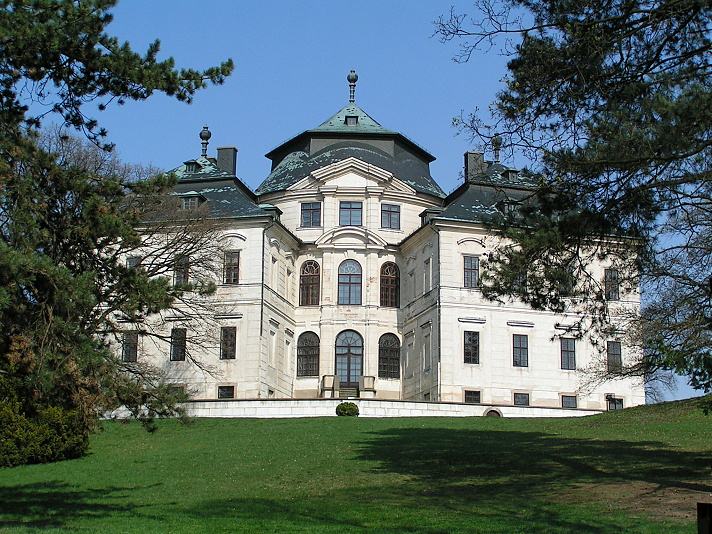
Karlova Koruna Chateau by Jan Santini Aichel and František Maxmilián Kaňka, 1721–1723

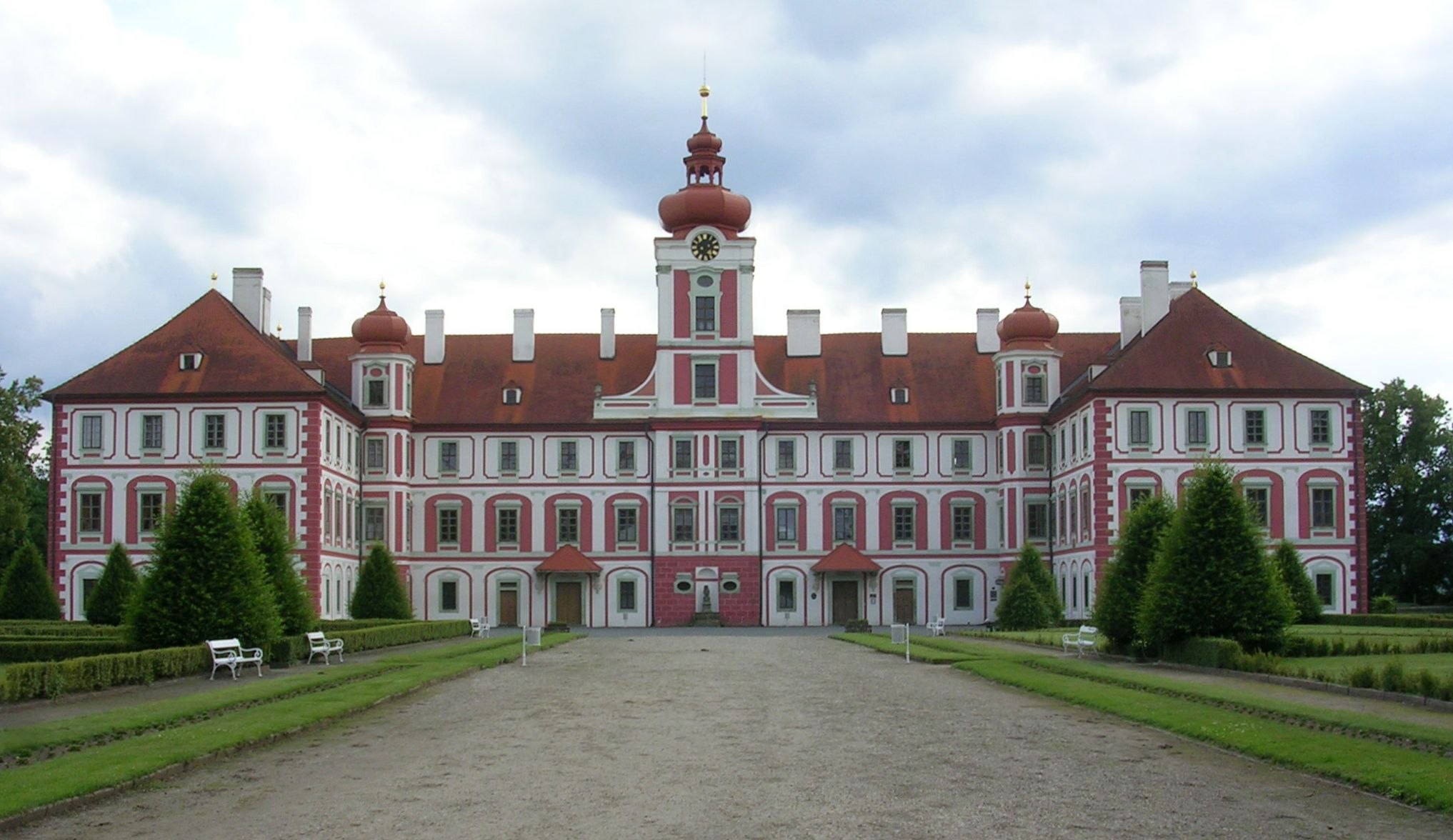
Mnichovo Hradiště Chateau by Marco Antonio Canevalle, 1690s–1720s

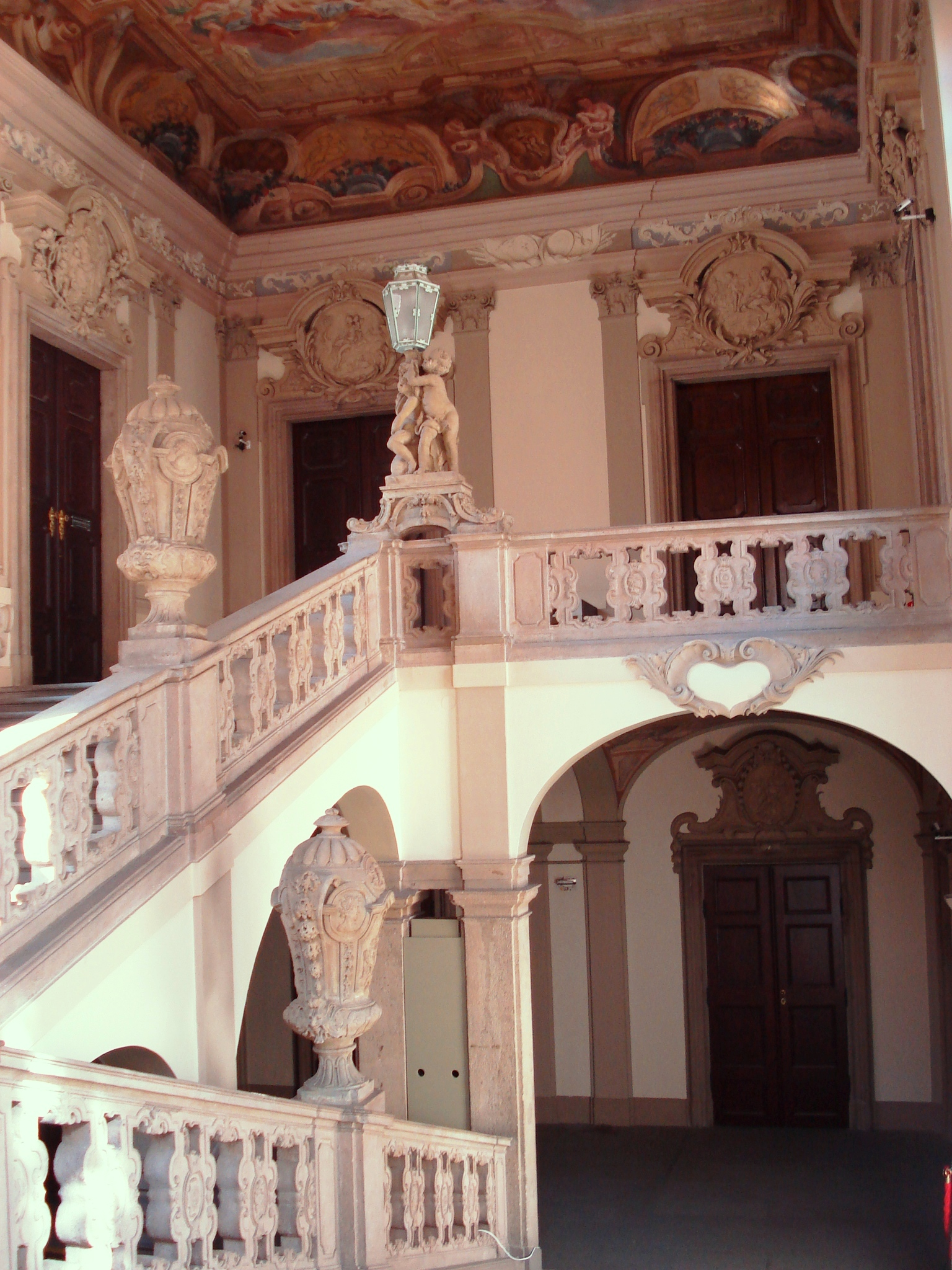
Staircase of the Clam-Gallas Palace in Prague by Johann Bernhard Fischer von Erlach, 1714–1718

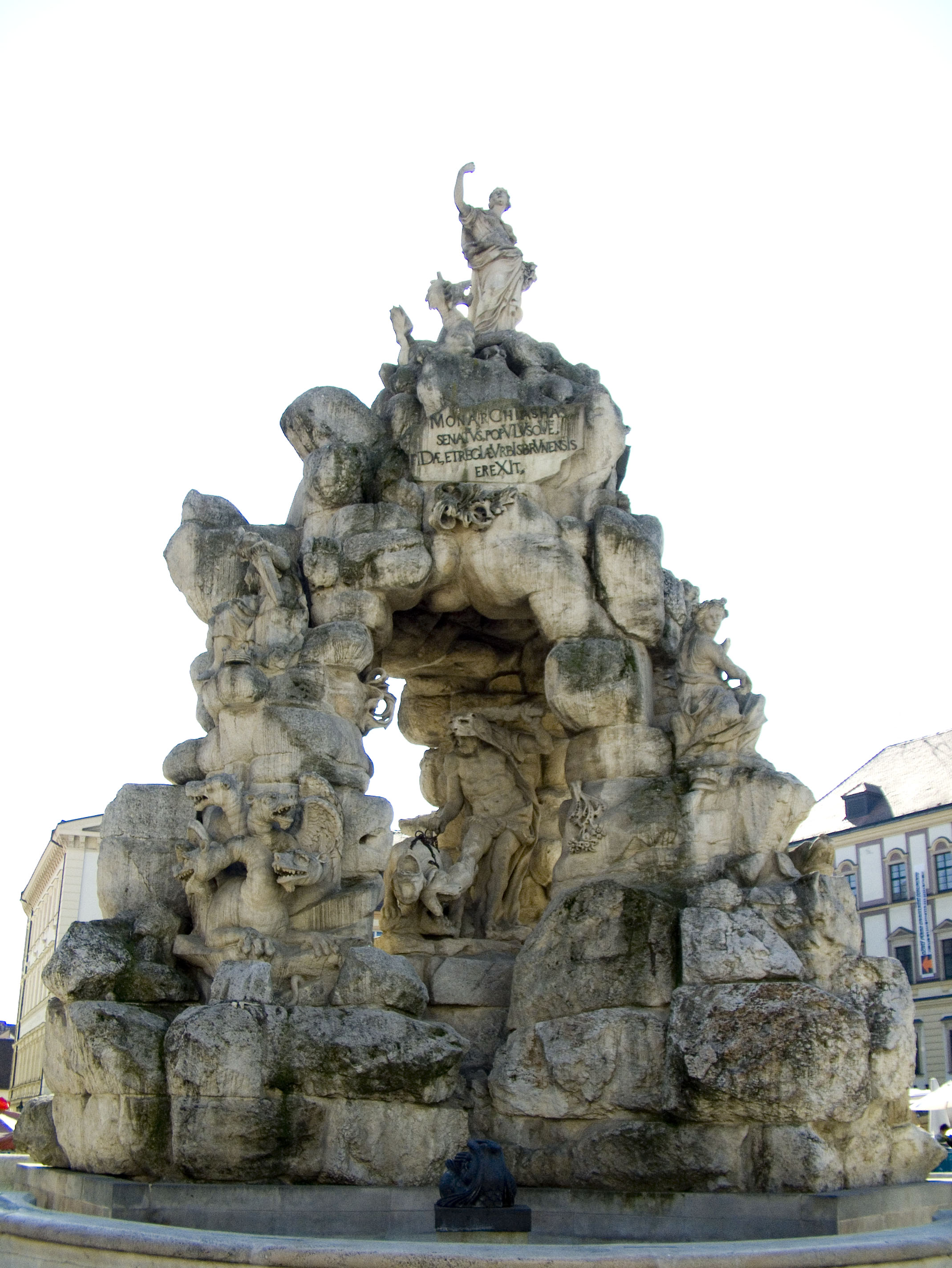
Parnas fountain in Brno by Johann Bernhard Fischer von Erlach, 1693–1695

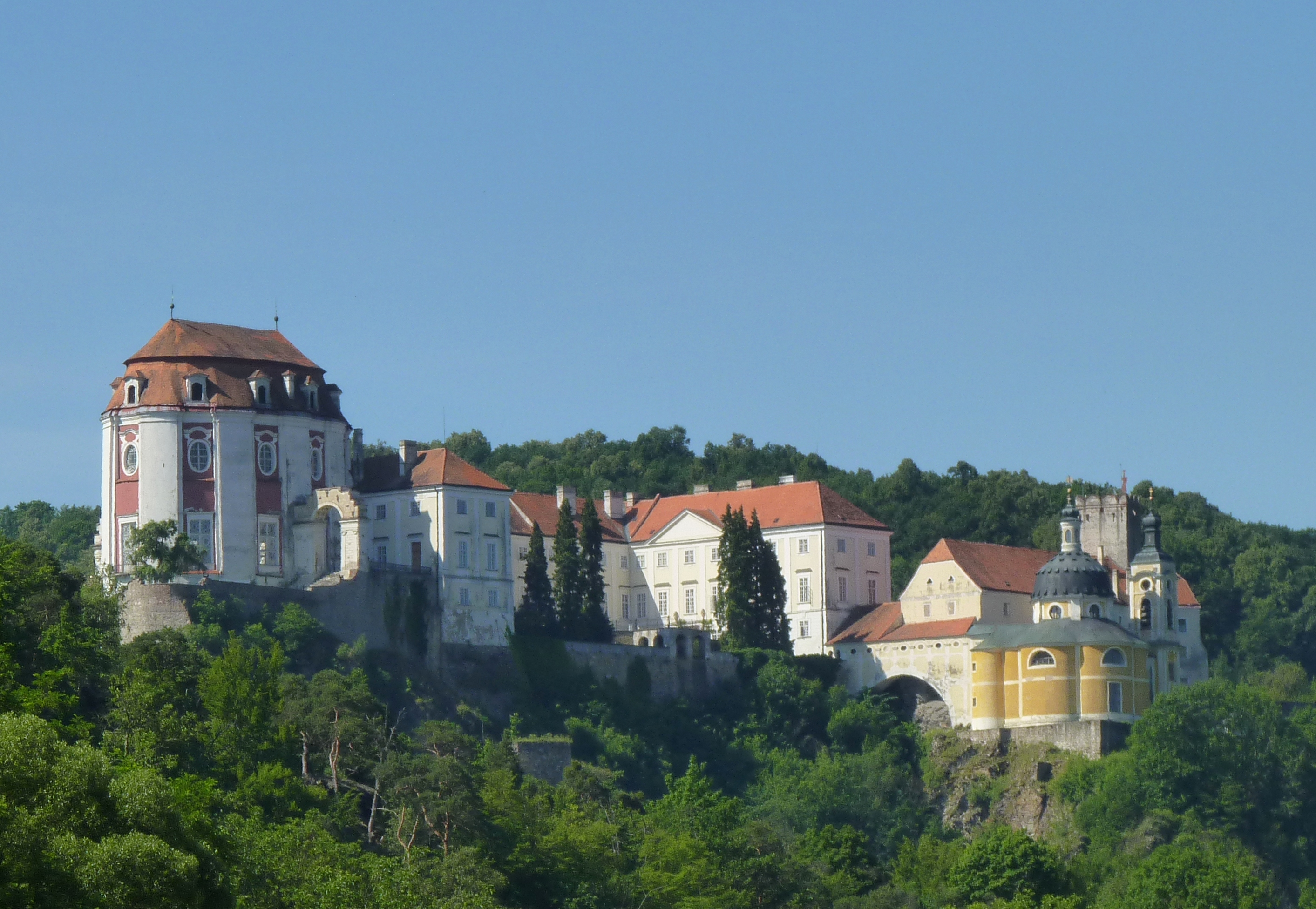
Vranov nad Dyjí Chateau with dome by Johann Bernhard Fischer von Erlach, early 18th century

=== Baroque Gothic ===
The Baroque Gothic style is a unique strand of Czech High Baroque art which connects the Bohemian Radical Baroque style with Gothic elements. The creator and main representative of this style was the Bohemian architect Jan Santini Aichel.

The Pilgrimage Church of Saint John of Nepomuk built in 1720s in this style by Jan Santini Aichel can be found on the UNESCO World Heritage List.

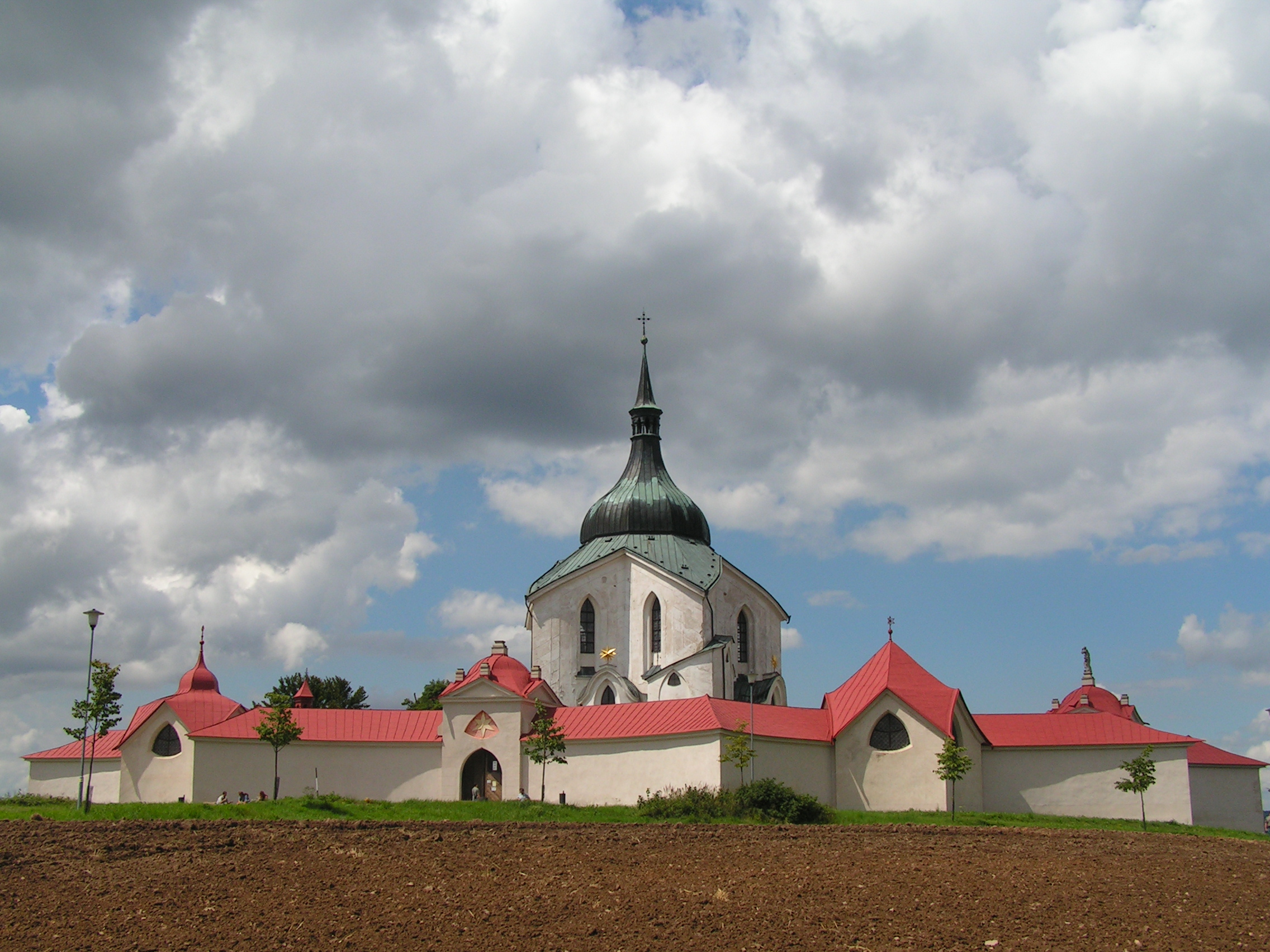
Pilgrimage Church of Saint John of Nepomuk at Zelená hora near Žďár nad Sázavou built in 1720s

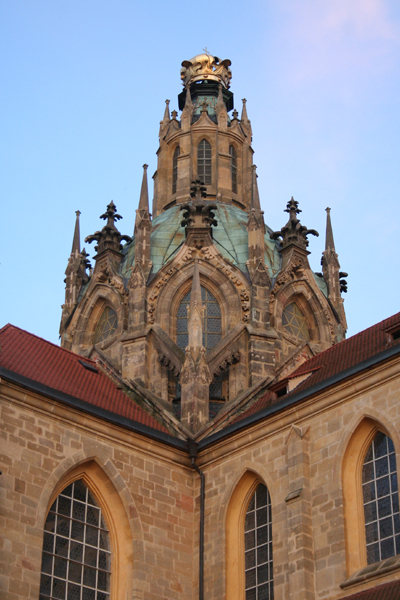
Dome of the church in Kladruby by Jan Santini Aichel, 1712–1726.

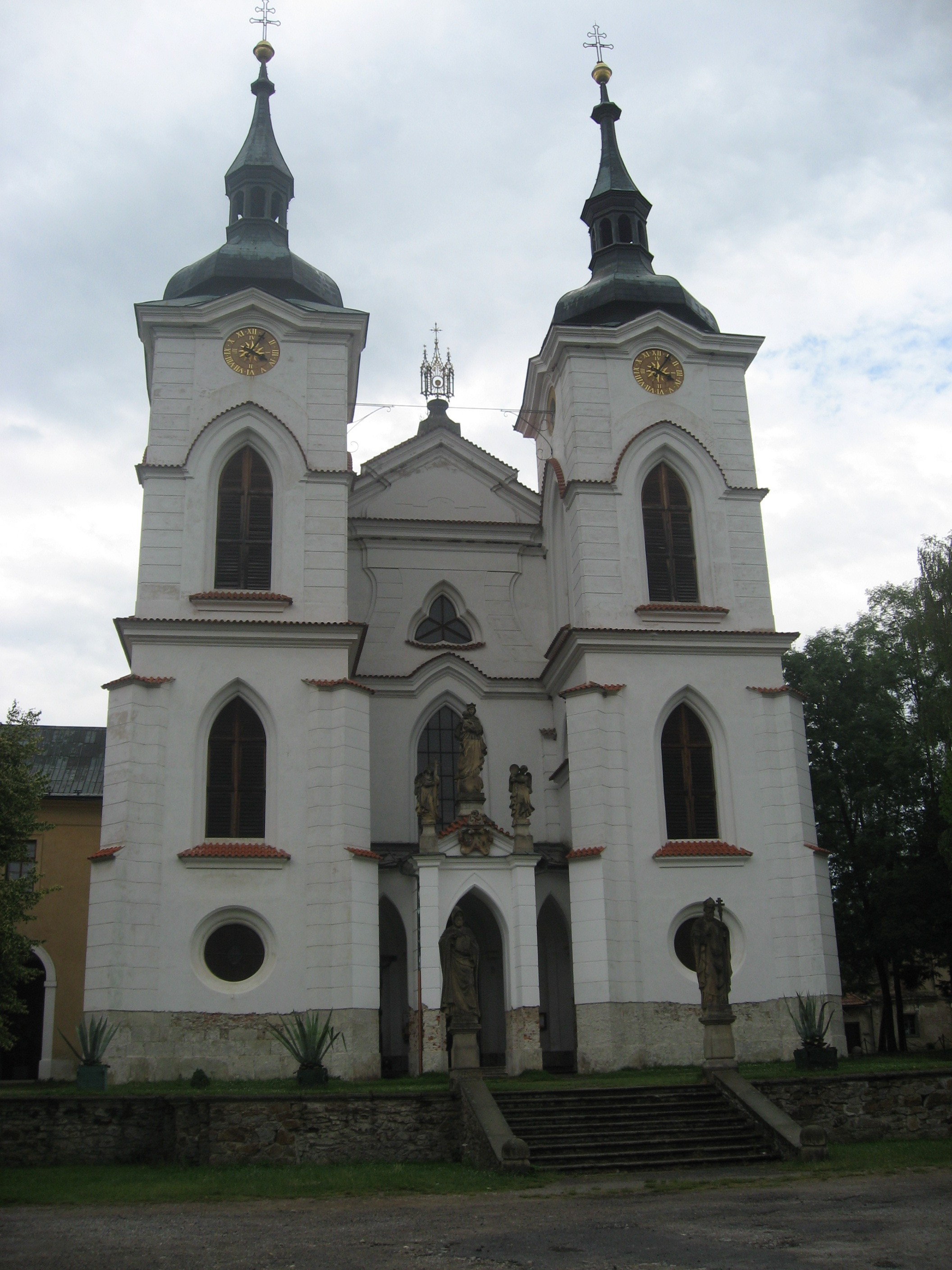
Church in the Želiv monastery by Jan Santini Aichel, 1714–1721

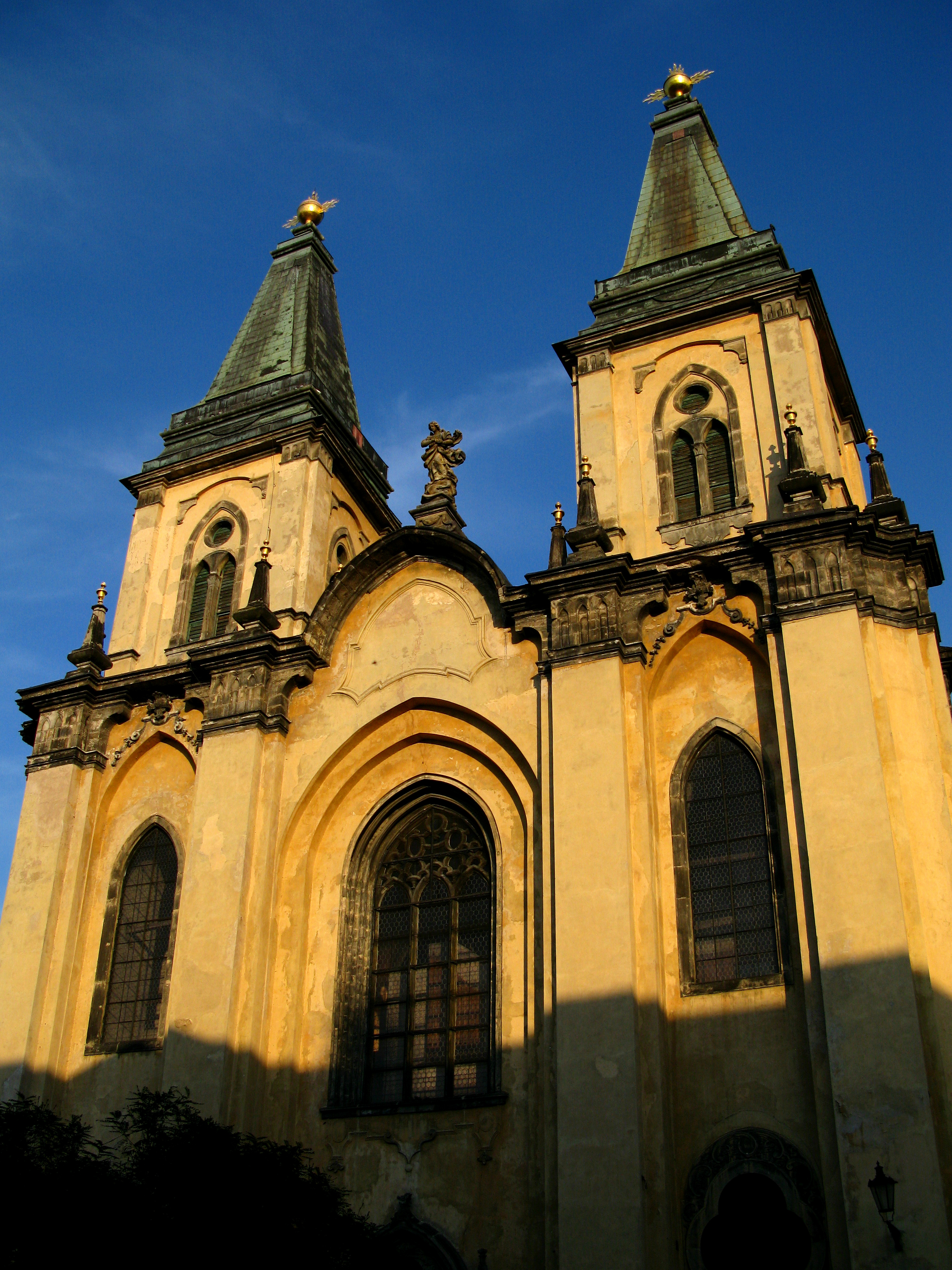
Church in Roudnice nad Labem by Octavio Broggio.

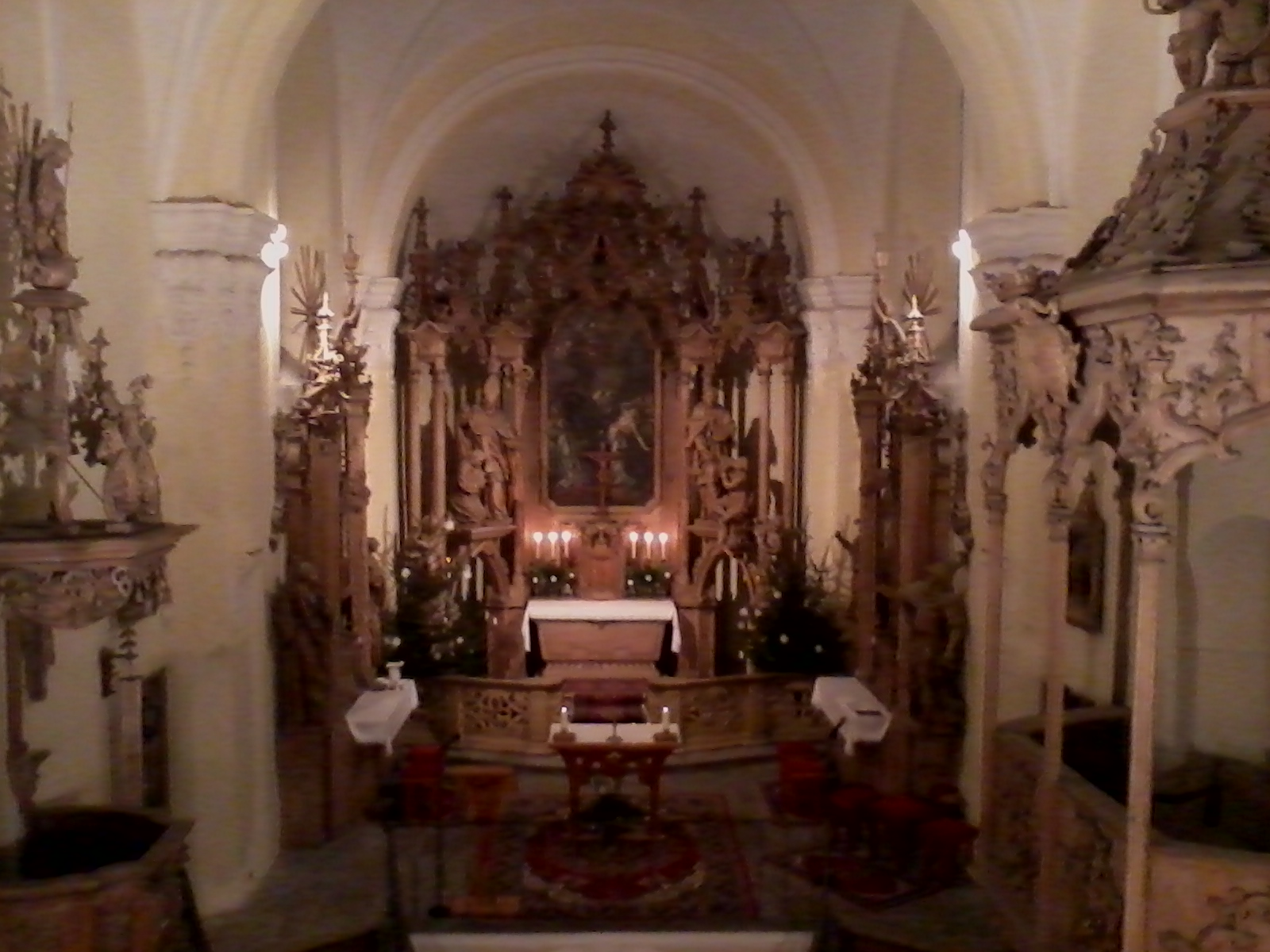
Wooden Baroque Gothic furnishings of the St. Gallus Church (kostel sv. Havla) in Poříčí nad Sázavou by Lazar Widemann, 1740s.

== Late Baroque and Rococo ==
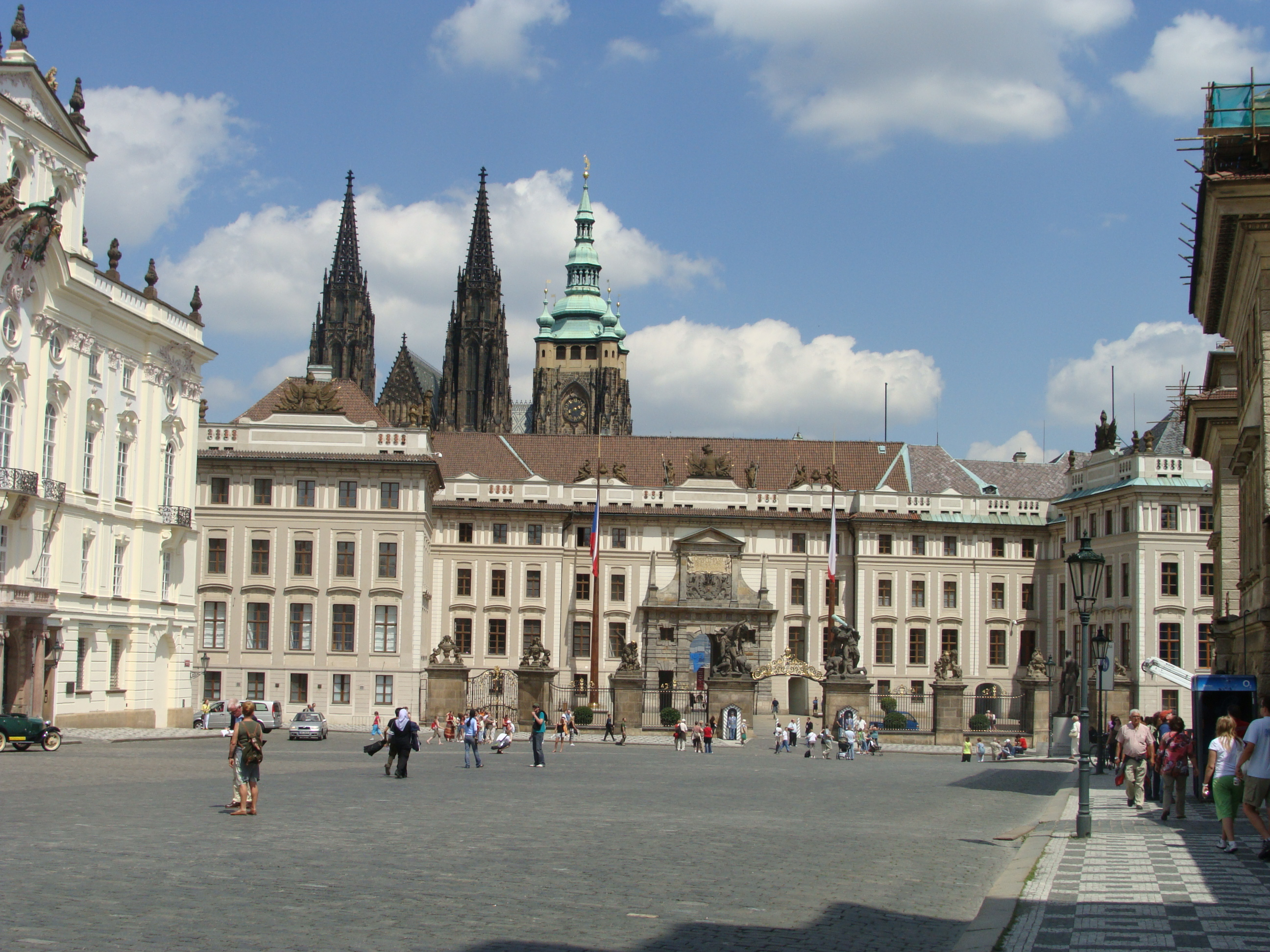
The main facade of the Prague Castle by Nicolò Pacassi and the Archbishop's Palace on the left

The late Baroque style was usual in the Crown of Bohemia during the reign of queen Maria Theresa (1740–1780). In that time the Rococo style occurred, which is very similar to Baroque but differs from it by its ornamental decoration. During her rule the Neoclassical style came to the Czech lands and after her death replaced the Baroque style.

The examples of the late Baroque architecture (with Rococo elements) in Prague are the Archbishop's Palace or the Goltz-Kinsky Palace on the Old Town Square. In the style of Baroque Classicism the New Royal Palace of the Prague Castle was rebuilt by the Viennese architect Nicolò Pacassi in the second half of the 18th century.

== See also ==
- Czech Gothic architecture
- Czech Renaissance architecture
