= Ignác Raab =

Czech painter and Jesuit brother

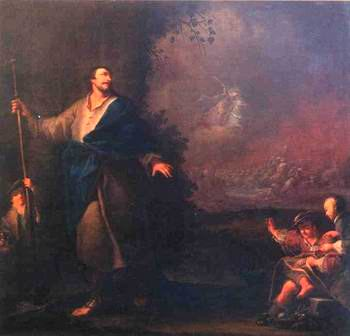
St. James the Greater by Ignác Viktorin Raab

Ignác Viktorin Raab (5 September 1715 – 2 February 1787) was a Czech painter and Jesuit brother. He is considered one of the most important Czech painters of the 18th century.

Raab's work can be traced to the influence of Italian and Czech masters, including Petr Brandl, amongst others. His work is considered to be in Rococo style, but some remnants of the Baroque are still evident. Raab tended to sign his works, considering this to be a right given to an author by God, whom he believed was the originator of his talent.

He created many paintings and frescoes in various churches, monasteries and other religious buildings, including the altarpieces of the Churches of St. Ignatius and St. Nicholas in Prague. He is also listed as the author of the altarpieces in churches in Opava, Church of the Holy Trinity in Fulnek. Two of his paintings of Saints Odile and Thecla are located on the side altars in the Church of St. Procopius in Letinech.

== Biography ==
Raab was born in 1715 in Nechanice near Nový Bydžov as the 12th child to father František. His father sent him to Jičín to study under painter Jan Jiří Major, a disciple of the painter Petr Brandl, who he went on to study under for seven years.

In 1744, at the age of 29, he entered the novitiate of the Society of Jesus. After two years as a brother novice in Brno, he was sent to Jesuit houses in Klatovy, Uherské Hradiště, University of Olomouc, Jihlava and Kutná Hora. He later went on to work primarily as a skilled hand painter, with various other roles including table service and elder care, in Prague, New Town and Opava. Throughout this period, Raab produced a large number of paintings and was involved in the decoration of a series of new churches. He also completed work depicting the lives of saints in the corridors of Jesuit colleges, and to a lesser extent, painted frescos.

The longest period of his Jesuit life was spent at the Clementinum in Prague, where he lived from 1758 to 1769 and again in 1771. At the Clementinum he gradually created a painting workshop. In addition to paintings, Raab produced drawings for works of sculpture, oversaw their implementation, and, if necessary, sculpted them himself. His Jesuit colleagues included the painter Josef Kramolín.

Raab's stay at the Clementinum was interrupted in 1770, while living at the Church of St. Ignatius in the New Town of Prague. Four altarpieces by Raab are still visible in St. Ignatius: St. Liborius, St. Francis Xavier (with a small painting of St. Thecla), St. Barbara, and St. Francis Borgia. Corridors of the adjacent dormitory buildings were originally decorated with three major life cycles of the Jesuit saints, namely St. Ignatius of Loyola (27 canvases; 24 of which are preserved at Bohosudov), St. Francis Xavier (29, of which 12 are preserved at Bohosudov) and St. John Francis Regis (21, all of which are now lost). Associated with these are a series of ten paintings in the refectory, which represent scenes from the Old and New Testaments relating to food (four remain the property of the Vyšehrad Chapter). He also produced series of St. Aloysius Gonzaga (21, still preserved in Štěkeň) and St. Stanislaus Kostka (26, preserved in Štěkeň) which were done at the Clementinum. These 137 images of the saints (92 of them hanging in the New Church of St. Ignatius and adjacent buildings), each of approximately 2.2 × 2 meters were completed in about three years, between 1769 and 1771. Raab was occasionally assisted in this work by his workshop, but the quality of many of them indicates that they were created by Raab alone.

In 1773, the Jesuit Order was abolished and Raab had to adapt to a new life. He was eventually accepted by the Cistercian monks of Velehrad. The quality of his work gradually declined, with the light virtuosity of the Rococo style replaced with Classical elements.

In 1784, the Velehrad Monastery met the fate of many other religious houses in the Habsburg empire, and was abolished. However, Raab opted to stay, and spent the rest of his life in Velehrad, earning a livelihood from his artistic work. He died in 1787.
