= Charles Square =

Square in Prague, Czech Republic

Coordinates: 50.076°N 14.421°E

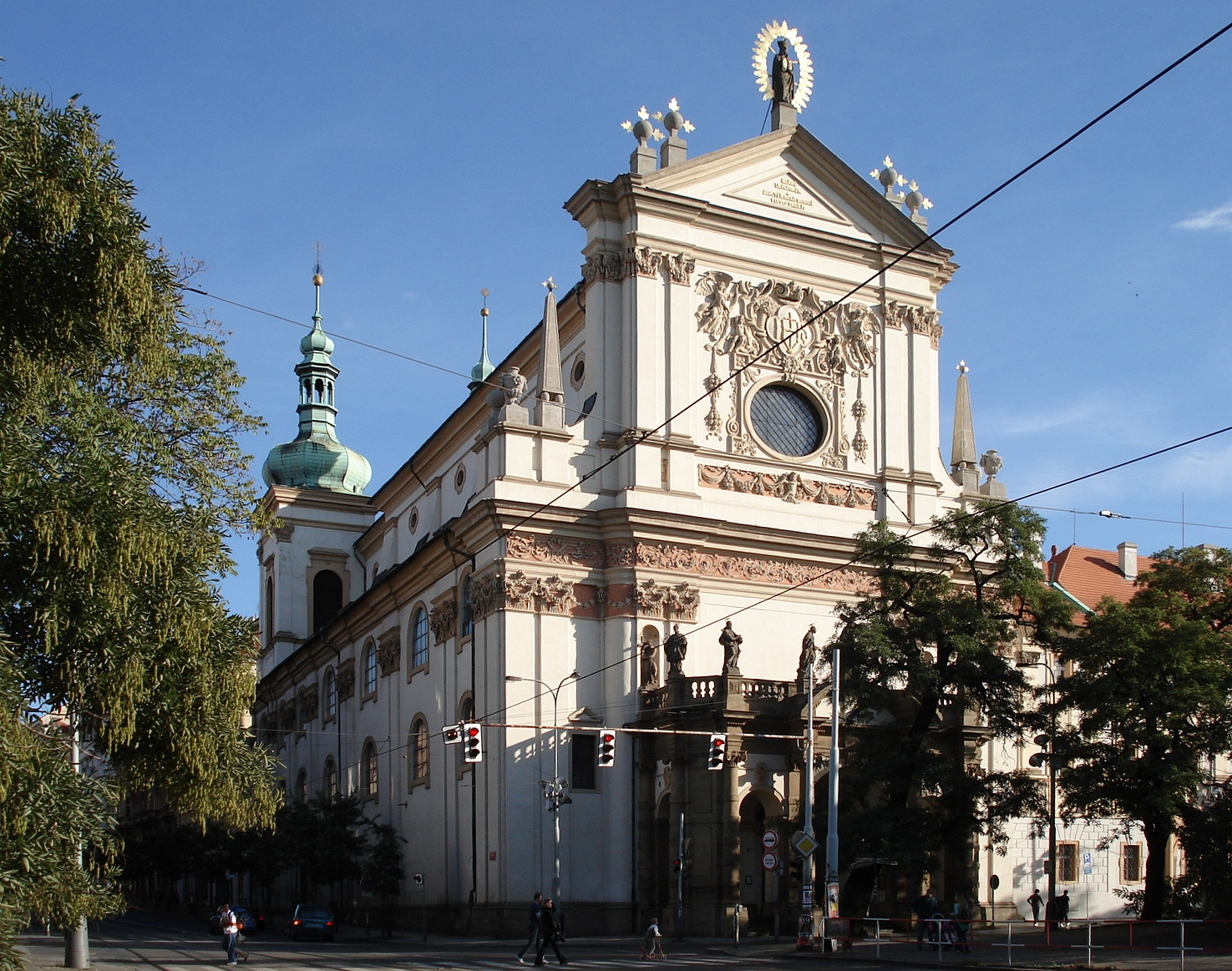
Church of St. Ignatius

Charles Square (Czech: Karlovo náměstí; German: Karlsplatz) is a city square in the New Town of Prague, Czech Republic. At roughly 80,550 m² it is one of the largest squares in the world and was the largest town square of the medieval Europe. Founded in 1348 as the main square of the New Town by Charles IV, it was known as Dobytčí trh (Cattle Market) from the 15th century and finally named after its founder in 1848. The central portion of the square was turned into a park in the 1860s.

The square is now one of the main transport hubs of the city centre with Karlovo náměstí metro station and numerous tram lines and busy roads crossing it in all directions.

== History ==
St. Ignatius Church and the hospital before 1892

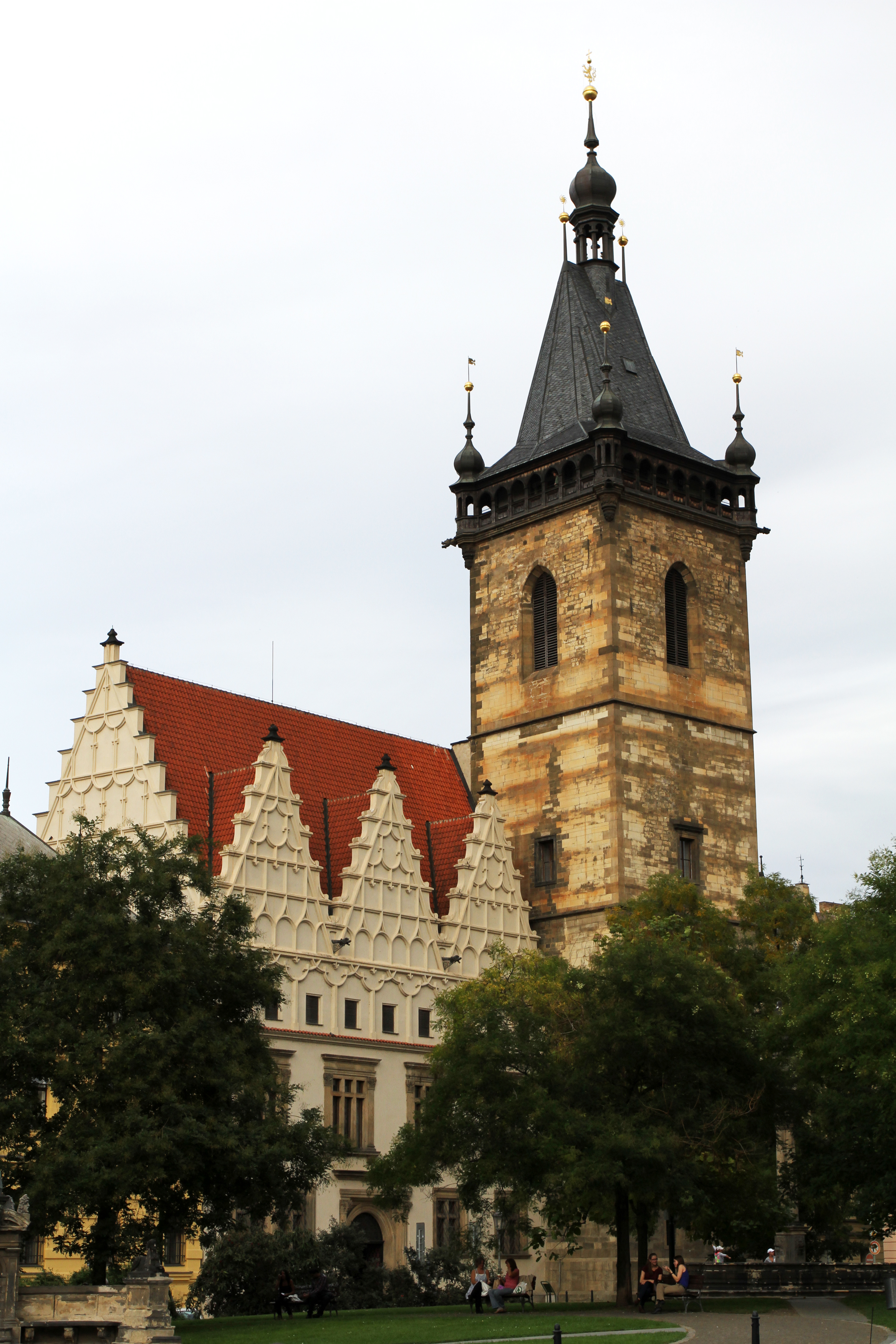
The Town Hall of the New Town

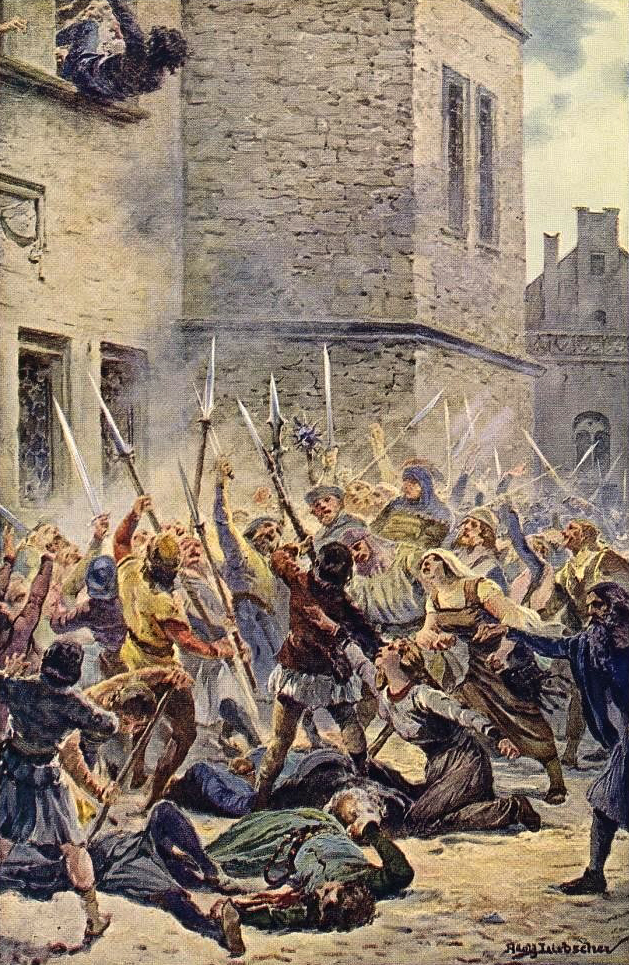
First Defenestration of Prague. Painting by Adolf Liebscher

Charles Square originated as a part of the New Town of Prague founded in 1348 by emperor Charles IV. With Wenceslas Square (Horse Market) and Senovážné náměstí (Hay Market) it became one of three main squares of the newly founded town. These squares were connected with one street (today streets Vodičkova and Jindřišská). Charles Square was supposed to be the most important square of the New Town of Prague and probably of the whole of Prague, therefore the Town Hall of the New Town was built there. Despite these plans the most important square later became Wenceslas Square.

In the late 14th century the Corpus Christi Chapel was built in the middle of the square. It was closed in 1784 and demolished a few years later. This chapel was a very important place of pilgrimage in the late 14th and early 15th century, because the holy relics and crown jewels of the Holy Roman Empire were shown there to thousands of pilgrims.

On 30 July 1419 the Hussite Wars broke out in this square, when Hussites led by priest Jan Želivský threw some Catholic councilors from windows of the New Town Hall. This event is called "the First Defenestration of Prague".

In the 17th century the Jesuits started to build their New Town residence on Charles Square. They also founded a new church dedicated to their patron saint and founder of the Jesuit Order, St. Ignatius of Loyola. This church was designed by Carlo Lurago and built in 1655-1677 in the early Baroque style.

On the south side of the square there is a gate to the Church of St. John of Nepomuk "on the Rock" which was built in the high Baroque style in 1730s by Kilian Ignac Dientzenhofer.

== Important buildings ==
- New Town Hall (Prague)
- Church of St. Ignatius
- former Jesuit school
- Church of St. John of Nepomuk "on the Rock"
- neo-renaissance building of the Czech Technical University in Prague

== See also ==
- Statue of Saint Joseph, Charles Square

== Literature ==
- Rygl, Tomáš. Prague: Detailed Picture Guide. Prague: ATP publishing, 2007. ISBN 80-86893-50-2
