= Statue of Saint Joseph, Charles Square =

Statue in Prague, Czech Republic

Statue of Saint Joseph
- Socha svatého Josefa (Czech)
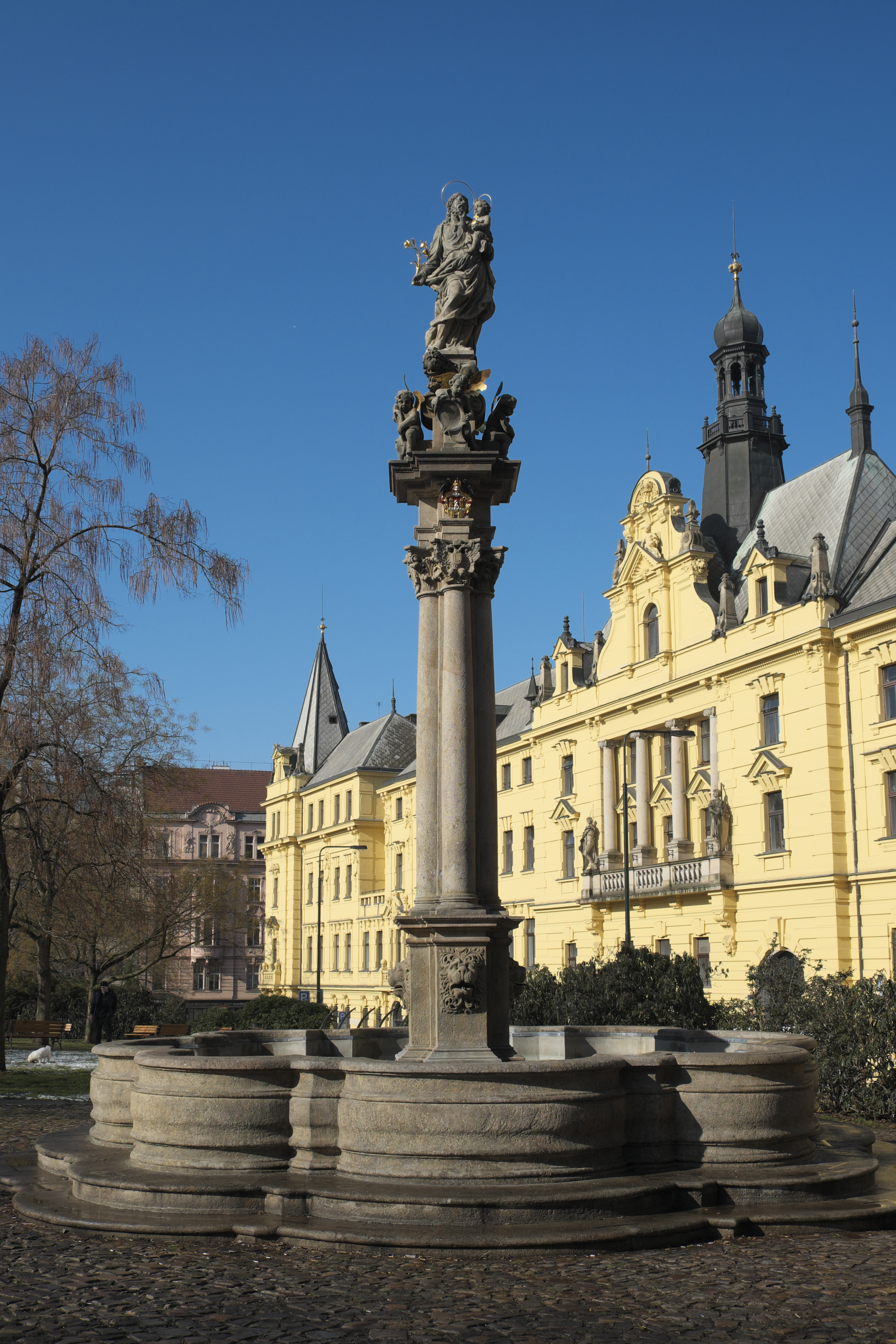
- The statue in 2018
- Artist: Matěj Václav Jäckel
- Year: 1698
- Catalogue: 1000152115
- Medium: Sandstone
- Movement: Baroque
- Subject: St. Joseph
- Location: Prague, Czech Republic; 50°4′40.5″N 14°25′15.5″E

The statue of Saint Joseph (Czech: Socha svatého Josefa) is located in front of New Town Hall on Charles Square (Karlovo náměstí), in Prague, Czech Republic.
