= Matthias Gate =

Gate in Prague, Czech Republic

Coordinates: 50.0899°N 14.3988°E

- Matyášova brána
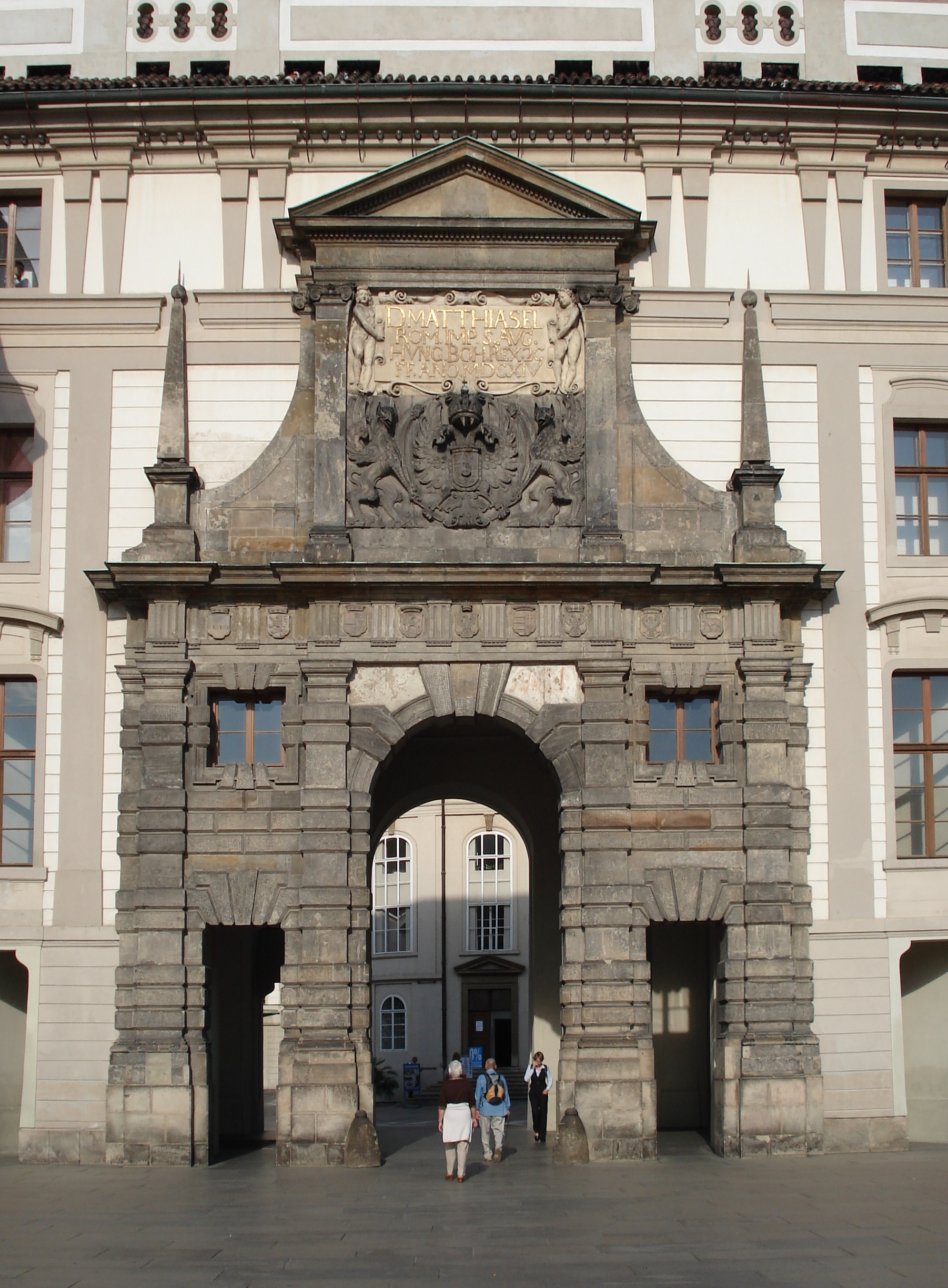

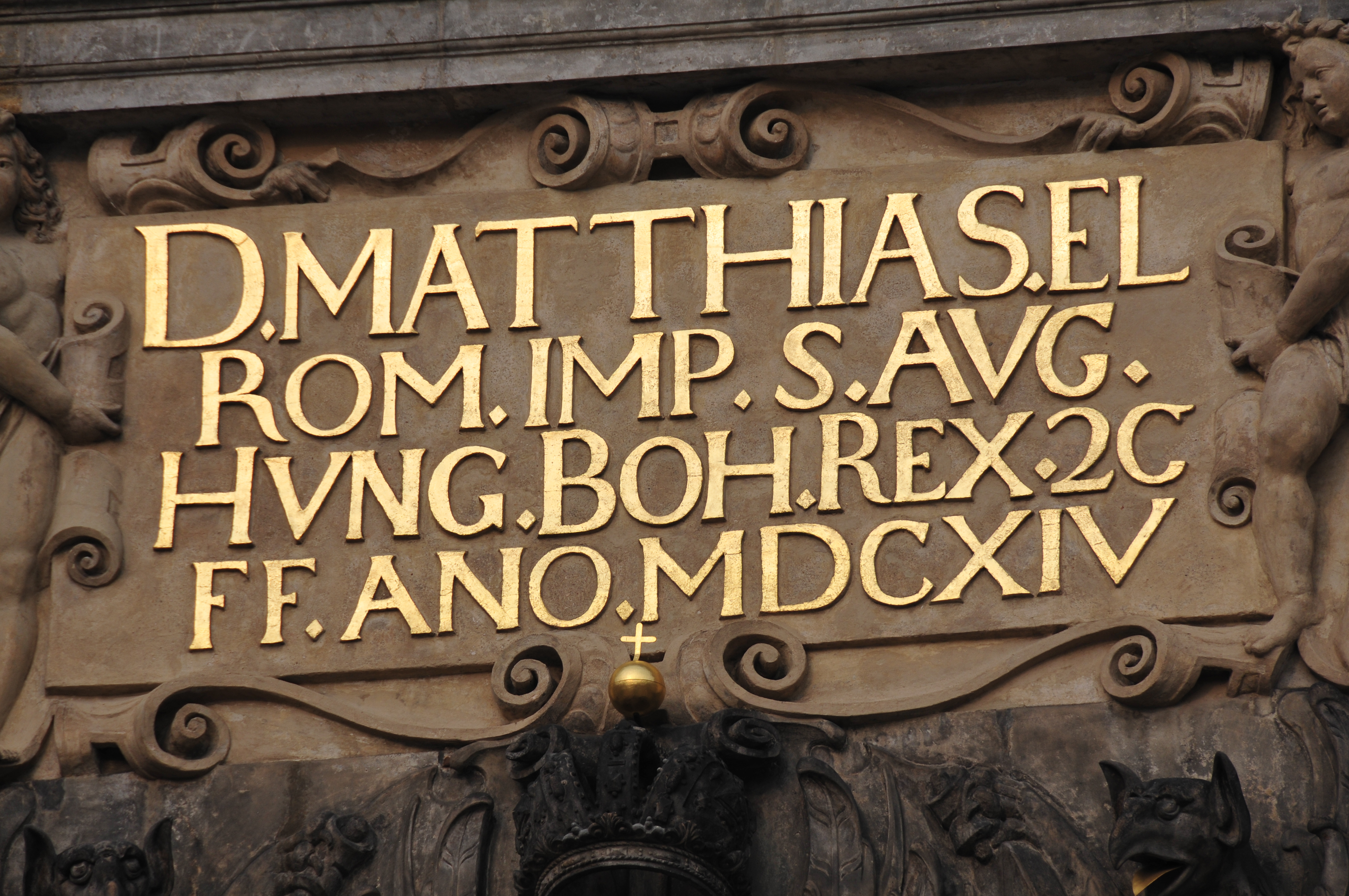
- Inscription
- Interactive map of the Matthias Gate area

General information
- Type: Gate
- Location: Prague, Prague, Czech Republic.
- Opened: 1614

Matthias Gate (Czech: Matyášova brána), or Matthias' Gate, is a gate between the first and the second courtyards of Prague Castle in Prague, Czech Republic. It was erected by Matthias, Holy Roman Emperor in 1614.

The sign on the gate states, in Latin, D[ominus] Matthias El[ectus] Rom[anus] Imp[erator] S[emper] Aug[ustus] Hung[ariae] Boh[emiae] Rex etc. F[ieri] F[ecit] An[n]o MDCXIV. It translates to "Master Matthias, elected Roman Emperor, forever August, King of Hungary, Bohemia etc., ordered this to be built in the year 1614."
