= St. Ignatius Church, Prague =

St. Ignatius Church
- Czech: Kostel svatého Ignáce
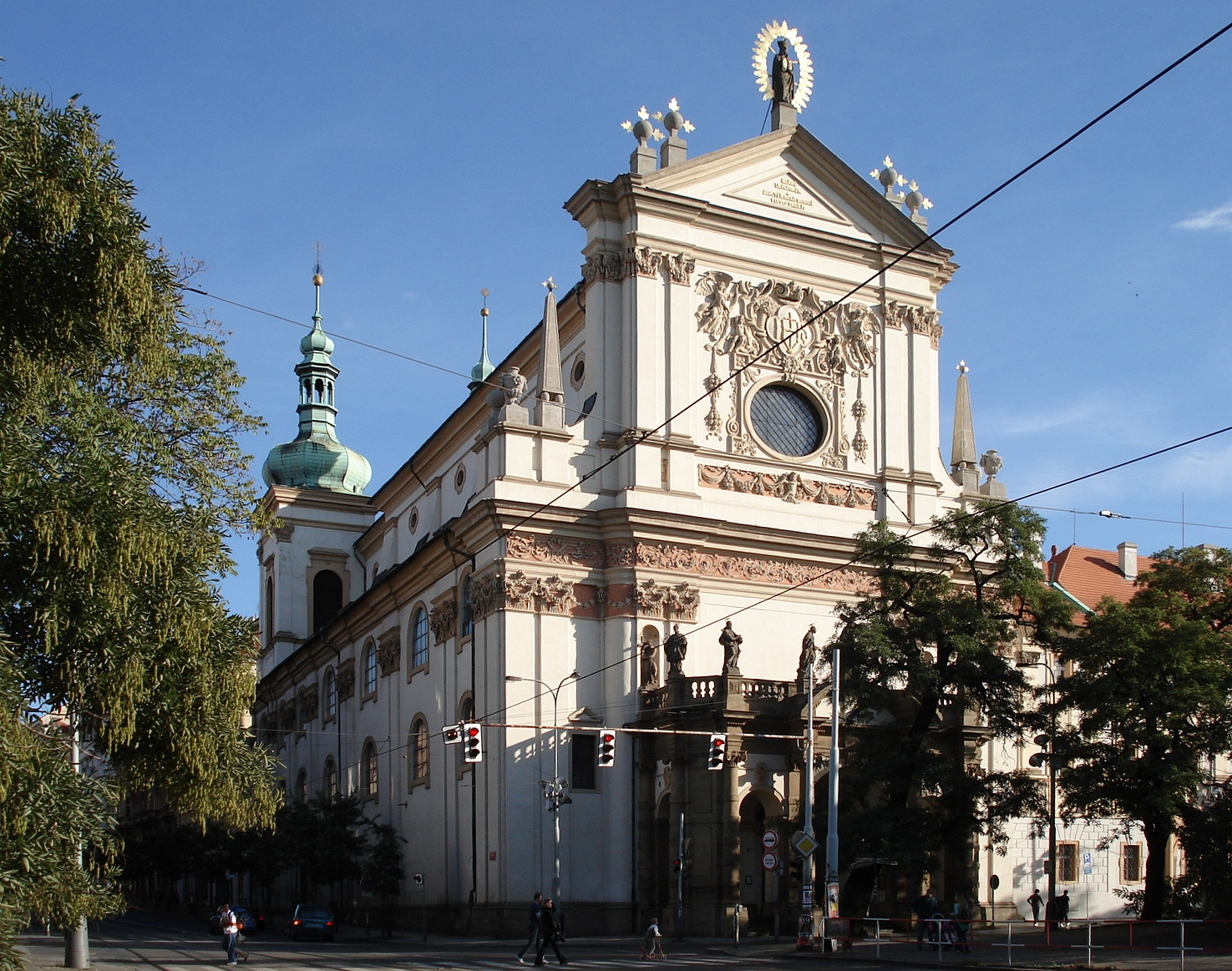
- The church, in 2006

- Location of the church in central Prague
- 50°4′32″N 14°25′16″E
- Country: Czech Republic
- Denomination: Roman Catholic
- Religious order: Jesuits

History
- Status: Church
- Dedication: St. Ignatius of Loyola

Architecture
- Functional status: Built
- Architect: Carlo Lurago
- Architectural type: Baroque
- Groundbreaking: 1655
- Completed: 1677

St. Ignatius Church (Czech: Kostel svatého Ignáce) is a Roman Catholic church, located in Charles Square, Prague, in the Czech Republic.

== History ==
The church and the hospital before 1892

The church was designed by Carlo Lurago in the early Baroque style, and built between 1655 and 1677. The church was built as part of the new Nove Mesto residence of the city's Jesuits, the third largest Jesuit complex in Europe, and dedicated to their patron saint and founder of the Jesuit Order, St. Ignatius of Loyola.

The top of the façade carries a statue of St. Ignatius Loyola, placed there in 1671, with a halo surrounding his whole body. This feature was considered controversial at the time it was installed, as such a decoration was only considered appropriate for statues of Jesus Christ. The decorative painting of the exterior was carried out by Jan Jiří Heinsch and the sculpture work was that of Matěj Václav Jäckel. The interior is characterised by stucco decoration and features statues of several Jesuit and Czech saints. Many of the interior furnishings of the church date from around 1770, added by Jesuit painter Ignác Raab, who lived briefly at the complex.

== See also ==
- List of Jesuit sites
