= Carlo Lurago =

Italian architect

Carlo Lurago (also spelled Luraghi) (1615 – 12 October 1684) was an Italian architect who was active in Prague.

He was born in Pellio Superiore in the Val d'Intelvi, near Como. At the age of 23, as an already an accomplished plasterer, he moved to Prague. He would build several different Jesuit churches and cloisters there, including some at the Clementinum, in the early baroque style. His first commission was the stucco decoration on the gothic St. Saviour Church in Prague. He also worked on the Saint Eligius Chapel there in 1654, before his work was redone by Domenico Orsi.

Lurago was also successful outside of Bohemia. He developed the plans for the Passau Cathedral. It is notable because the main altar has a series of flat elliptical domes. This arch design foreshadows many other buildings of the baroque style. Another notable example of his work is the pilgrimage church of Maria Taferl, which had to be completed by Jakob Prandtauer after Lurago died in Passau.

== Works ==
- 1637–1659: Baroque town hall, Náchod
- 1638–1648: St. Saviour, Prague
- 1640–1642: Jesuit Church and College House, Březnice
- 1650–1659: Modifications and enlargement of Náchod Castle
- c. 1650: Modification of the Church of St. Mary-under-the-Chain, Malá Strana, Prague
- 1651: Modification of the Lobkowicz Palace, Prague
- 1653–1660: The Clementinum, Old Town, Prague
- 1653–1658: Modification and baroquification of the castle annex for the Counts of Herberstein, Gorzanów, Silesia
- 1654–1666: Jesuit Church of the Assumption, Hradec Králové
- 1654–1679: Church of the Immaculate Conception of the Virgin Mary and of Saint Ignatius, Klatovy
- 1655–1661: Modification of the Castle in Nové Město nad Metují
- 1657–1739: Church of the Nativity of Saint John the Baptist, Svatý Jan pod Skalou
- 1658: "Stone Birdhouses", Prague
- 1659–1674: Cloister of the pilgrimage church of Svatá Hora in Příbram
- 1578–1653: Clementinum, St. Salvator, Old Town, Prague
- 1654–1690: Jesuit College Kłodzko, Silesia
- 1663–1668: Cloister "im Waldl", Kladno
- 1664: New Inn, Tursko
- 1665–1670: St. Ignatius Church, Prague
- 1665–1670: Church of the Holy Trinity, Klášterec nad Ohří
- 1666–1668: Hunting lodges for Humprecht Jan Czernin, Sobotka
- 1668: St. Stephen's Cathedral, Passau
- 1670: Pilgrimage church in Maria Taferl
- 1673: Jesuit college by the Church of St. Nicholas, Malá Strana, Prague
- 1688: Remodeling of St. Ignatius Church in Chomutov
