= Silesian architecture =

Silesian architecture is the name given to the constructions made in Silesia throughout time, and those by Silesian architects worldwide. The name is also applied to buildings made within its geographical limits before the constitution of Silesia as a duchy (earlier than 1172) or before this name was given to those territories, and largely depends on the historical moment. Due to historical, geographic, and generational diversity, Silesian architecture has had a host of influences.

== Romanesque architecture ==
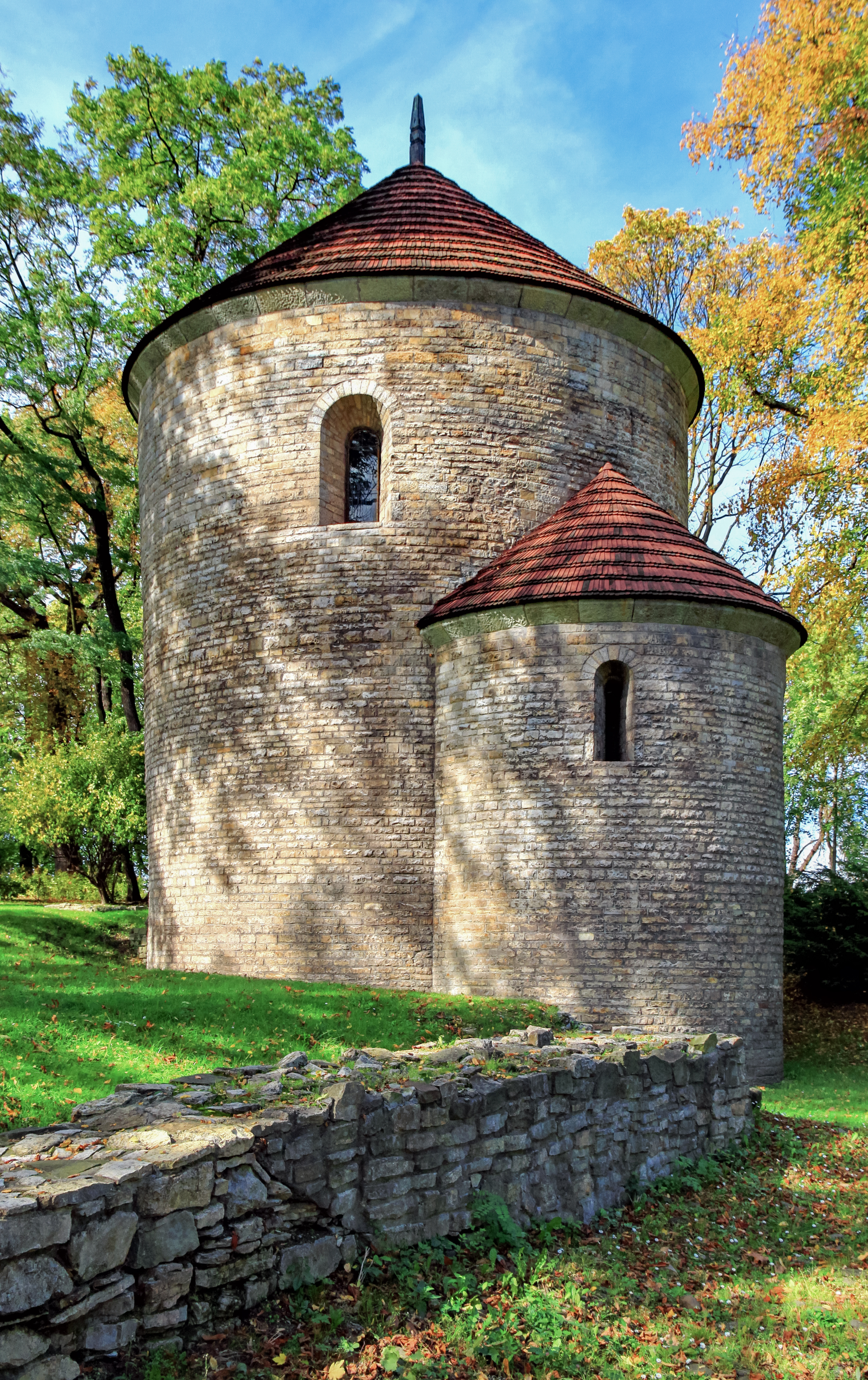
Romanesque rotunda in Cieszyn

The Romanesque art in Silesia appeared with the Christianization of the region. The first known structure, relics of a church on Ostrów Tumski in Wrocław, was built in the mid-10th century. Around 1000 Bolesław I of Poland founded a three-nave cathedral on the same place, styled after the cathedral in Gniezno. Few other buildings of that time are known. The rotunda in Cieszyn (Těšín), of Moravian- Bohemian origin, dates back to 1050.

The 12th century was a time of great advancement. The first monasteries and minsters, in Wrocław and Lubiąż, were built, and the quality of work improved significantly, as the builders adopted architectural styles from Southern Germany and Meuse. Outstanding achievements of this era were the cathedral and the abbey church of the Benedictine order in Wrocław, the latter being the most magnificent Romanesque building in Silesia. It was planned after its mother church in Tyniec near Kraków, whereas its Westwork was influenced by Thuringian traditions. The church of the first Cistercian monastery in Lubiąż, built by monks from Pforta in Thuringia, was the first of many buildings made of brick in Silesia.

The beginning of the 13th century was marked by a big increase in building activity, caused by the large influx of German settlers (Ostsiedlung). Most of the municipal churches in Silesia, built of stone or brick, emerged at that time. Examples were Głogów, Nysa, Jelenia Góra or Ziębice. These late Romanesque Silesian churches were a mix of local, Saxon-Thuringian and Bohemian traditions. There are only seven known examples of that time in Upper Silesia, but 67 in Lower Silesia, including secular buildings.

== Silesian Gothic ==
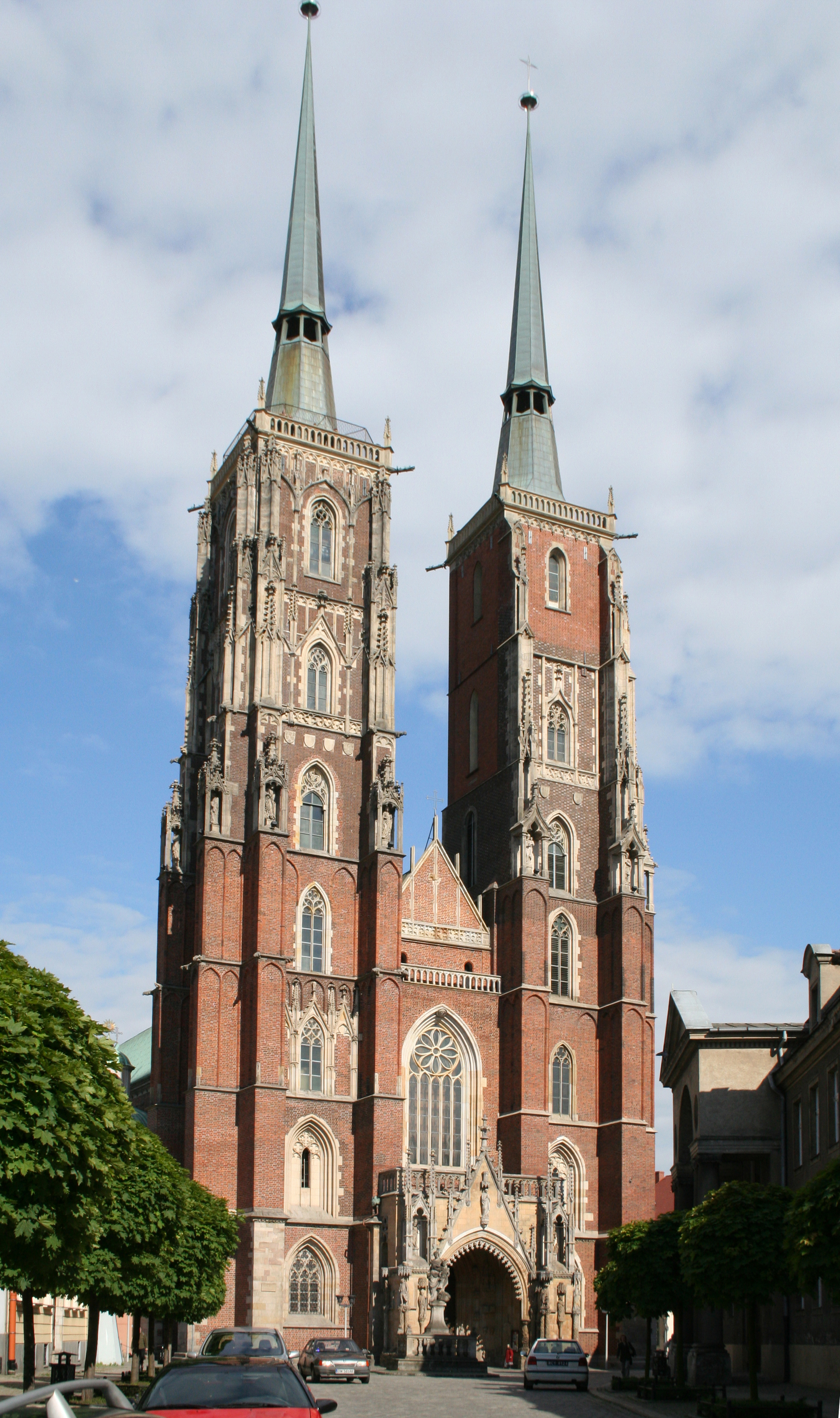
Wrocław Cathedral. Portico built by H. Berthold and P. Franzke between 1465 and 1468

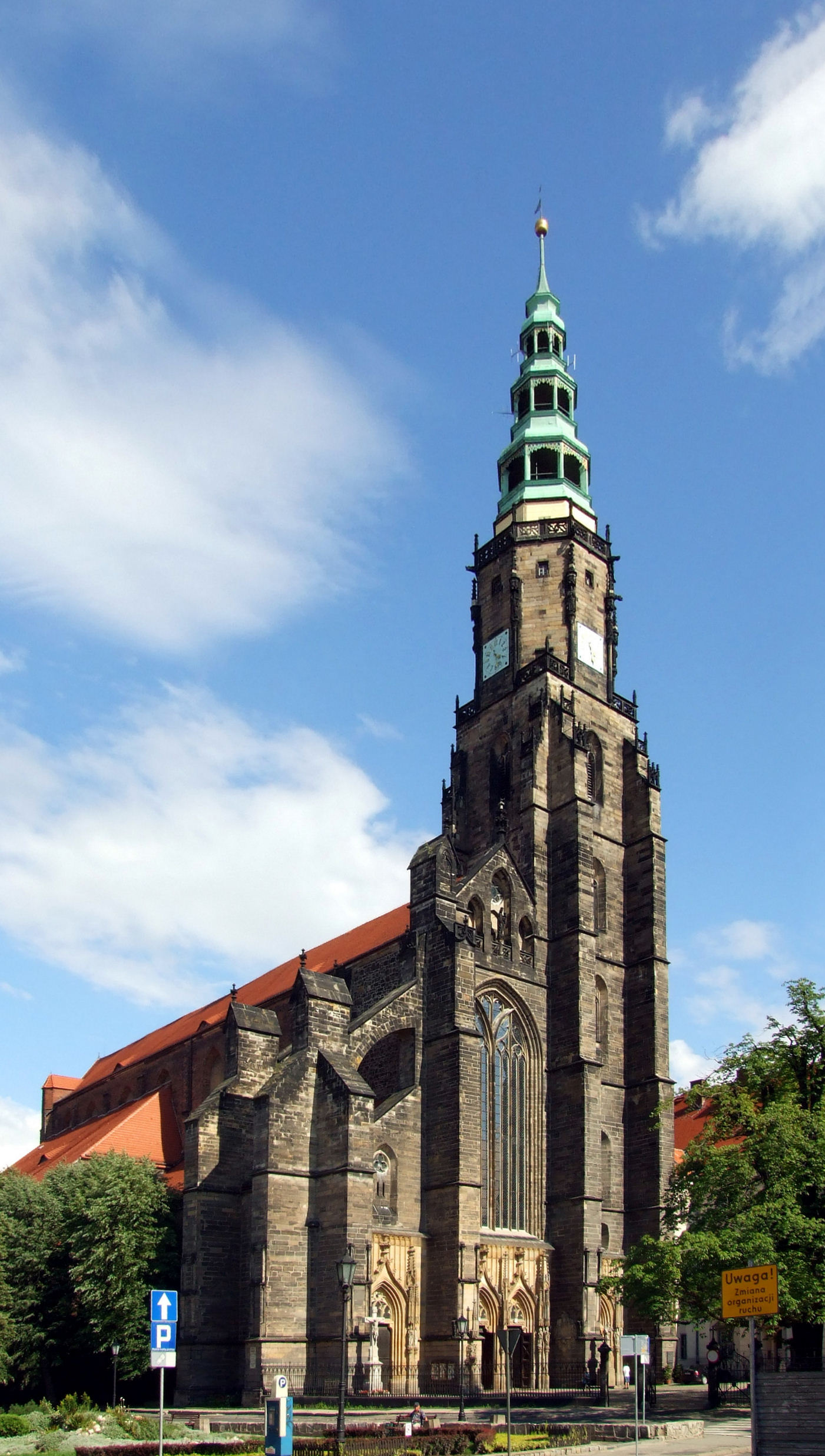
Świdnica Cathedral by Lucas Schleierweber

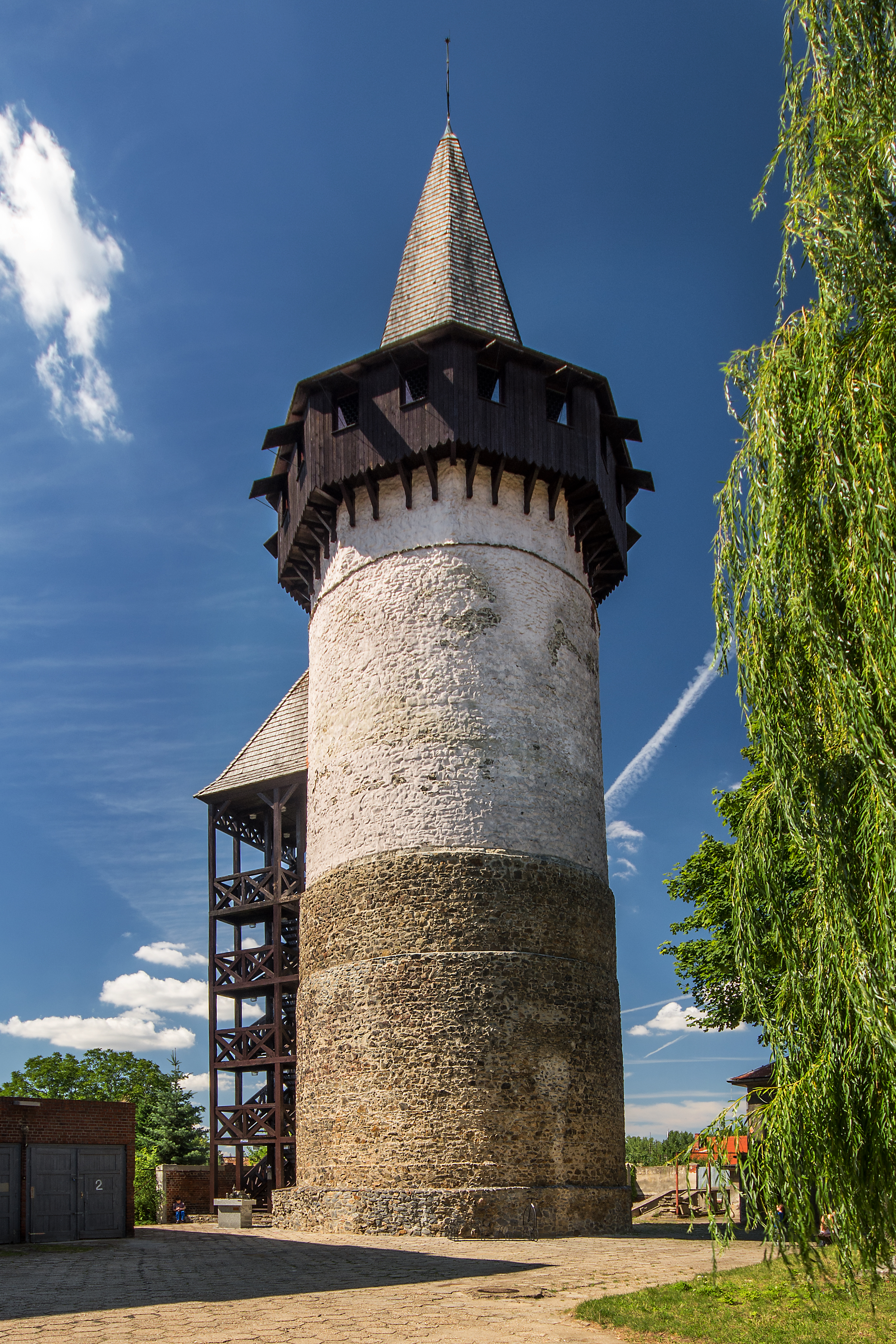
The bergfried of the Prudnik Castle from 13th century in Prudnik

The heralds of Gothic architecture were connected with the building activities of the Cistercians and the patronage of Henry I the Bearded. Two monasteries, in Trzebnica (Trebnitz) and Henryków (Heinrichau), as well as two residences, in Wrocław and Legnica (Liegnitz), were early examples and referred to architectonic standards in Southern Germany and along the Rhine. They probably indicate to the dynastic connection between Henry I and the House of Andechs. Characteristic attributes of all these buildings were the combination of brick constructions and details made of stone, which were most likely brought in via Altzella in Saxony.

The Tatar invasions of 1241 led to the decentralization of Silesia. Baronial patronage decreased whereas episcopal and later municipal patronage increased. The most important construction project of that time was the cathedral of Wrocław, which became the first pure Gothic building in Silesia. The chapel St. Hedwig in Trzebnica was another important structure of that era. Both buildings cited early French traditions, imported via Saxony, Bohemia and Austria. Most mendicant orders built their monasteries in the second half of the 13th century, most notably in Wrocław, Głogów, Brzeg and Strzelin. At the same time, the first hall churches appeared. The most original were in Ziębice and Złotoryja (Goldberg). A tower that remains of the castle in Prudnik is considered to be the oldest private defensive structure in Poland (circa 1255).

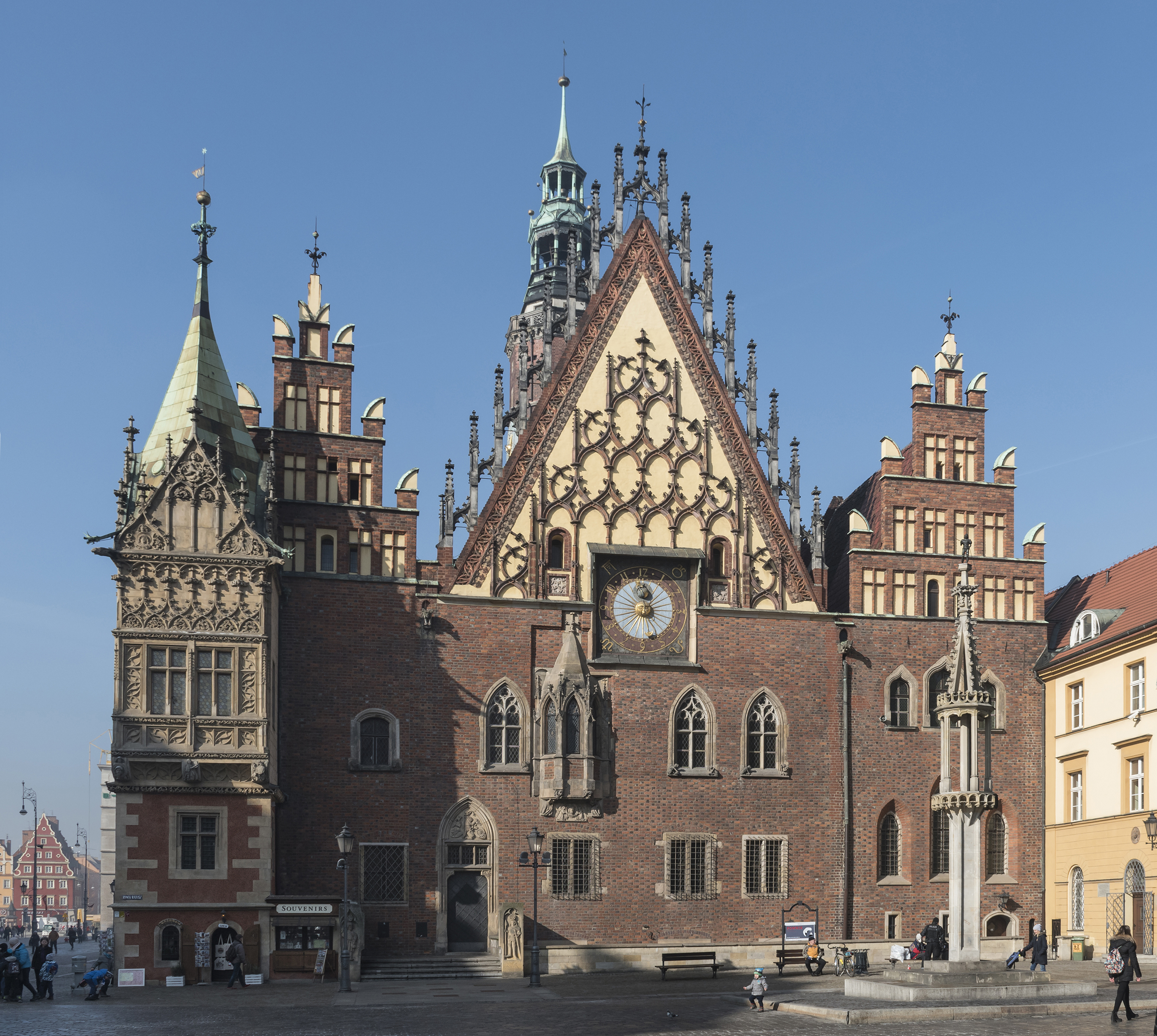
The Old Town Hall in Wrocław represents Saxon and Lusatian influences

Silesia's towns needed approximately 50 years after its foundation to get their independence. In the 14th century, many of these towns began to build their own big parish churches, and with the assistance of the new Bohemian sovereign, a dynamic sacral development program began. Dominant were now Bohemian, Moravian, Southern German and Lower Austrian architectural traditions, but mixed with local traditions which preferred more simple forms. The most characteristic creation of the entire 14th century remained the basilical municipal church with a long nave and no transept. This style was most probably derived from the Cistercian abbey in Zlatá Koruna (Goldenkron) in Bohemia. Although Silesia was now a part of Bohemia, a state of the Holy Roman Empire, the Parler Gothic had almost no influence. Architectural embellishments can only be found in three churches, probably all built by master builder Claus Brynner.

This dynamic sacral development program lasted the entire 14th century, and starting around 1370 many bigger cities added guild and family chapels to their parish churches. At the end of the century, all monastery construction projects ended, and with the spreading of the Hussite Wars to Silesia most building activities were greatly reduced.

The expansion of the town hall in Wrocław after 1480 marked a big change in the architectural history of Silesia. As it was obvious that local workshops, represented by Hans Berthold, could not meet the expectations, the city decided to invite experts from Saxony and Lusatia around master builder Paul Preusse. At the beginning of the new century, this influence from Saxony and Lusatia was most notably in western parts of Silesia, where Conrad Pflüger and Wendel Roskopf from Görlitz built city halls and churches in Löwenberg (Lwówek Śląski), Bunzlau (Bolesławiec), Sagan (Żagań) or Gröditzberg (Grodziec), all in the tradition of Benedikt Ried from Prague. Later Lucas Schleierweber from Schweidnitz (Świdnica) continued this Görlitz style and constructed buildings in other parts of Middle Silesia.

== Renaissance and Mannerism ==
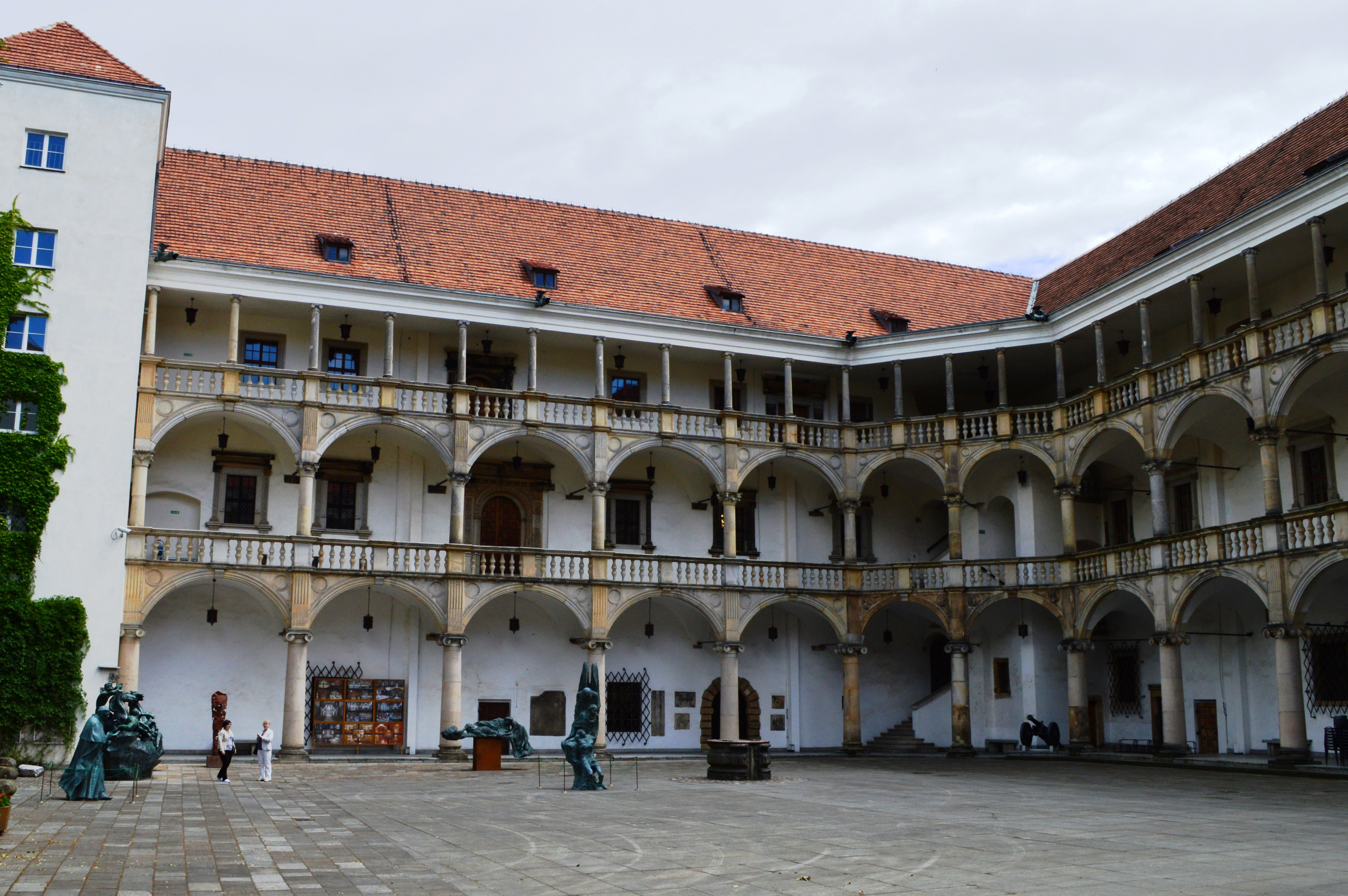
Brzeg Castle, one of the finest examples of Italian influenced Renaissance architecture in Silesia

The Renaissance era began with the accession of Johann V. Thurzó as Bishop of Breslau. As a great patron of the arts he introduced the new style in Silesia as he commissioned two foundations plates (1505, 1509) at his residence in Jauernig (Javorník, today in the Czech Republic) and the sacristy portal (1517) on the cathedral in Breslau. The latter was probably made by a local artist, whereas most other early Renaissance projects were carried out by Italians from Ticino, the so-called "Comasks". The most successful were members of the Parr family (Pahr, Bahr or Pario), which built the fortifications in Bolkenhain (Bolków) in 1539 and later worked in Brieg.

The oldest preserved Renaissance buildings today are house "To the golden crown" (1521–28) in Wrocław (demolished in 1906 and rebuilt after World War II) and the castle of Charles I, Duke of Münsterberg-Oels in Ząbkowice Śląskie (Frankenstein), built after 1524 by Benedikt Ried. Many buildings of that time still show the transition from Gothic to Renaissance, for instance the castle in Wojnowice (Wohnwitz) or the city halls in Bolesławiec (Bunzlau), Lwówek Śląski (Löwenberg) and Grodziec (Gröditzberg). Most of these buildings were probably built by Wendel Roskopf, a pupil of Benedikt Ried and author of a collection of exceptional Renaissance houses in Görlitz. He probably also was the constructor of Palais Rybisch in Wrocław, which was completed by an unnamed Italian artist after 1526.

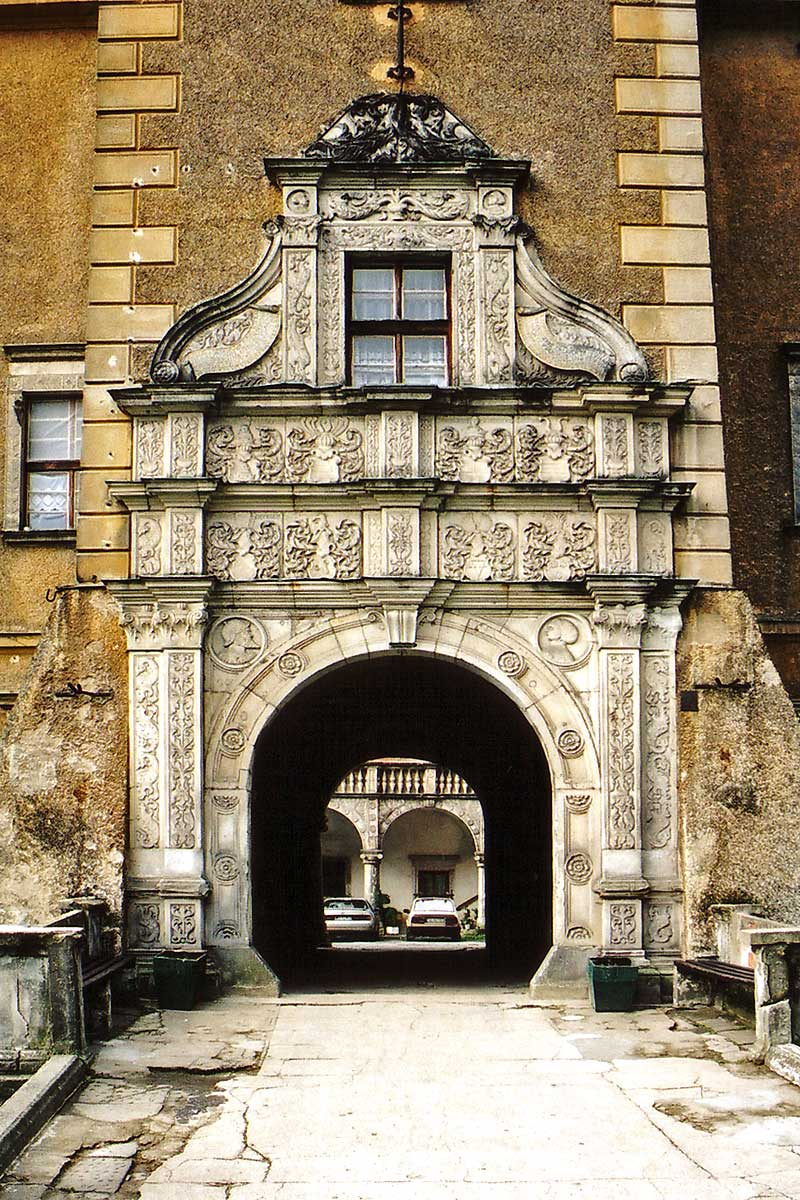
The gate of Płakowice Castle in Lwówek Śląski by Fr. Parr, showing Ramphold von Talkenberg, his wife and crests of several Silesian families

The high building activity in the Middle Ages resulted in cities which were saturated with churches. Only in exceptional cases new churches were planned, for instance St. Blasius (today St. Maria) in Ohlau (Oława), carried out by Bernhard Niuron in 1587. At that time most Silesian churches became Protestant and the interest shifted to small alterations of church interiors. A great exception was the conversion of the medieval church in Rothsürben (Żórawina) by Hans Schneider, which resulted in one of the best examples of Protestant ecclesiastical architecture in Middle Europe.

Much more coherent was the development of secular buildings. The first homogeneous Renaissance building was the gate of Legnica Castle, built 1533 by Georg von Amberg. The highlight of Silesian architecture of that time however represented Brzeg Castle and its castle gate, which is deemed to be the symbol of Silesian Renaissance. It was built between 1544 and 1570 by Franziskus Parr, the figurative architectural sculptures, the biggest ensemble in Silesia, were carried out by Saxon master Andreas Walther d.Ä.. It depicts George II of Brieg, his wife Barbara von Brandenburg and his line of ancestors. It was most probably modeled after Dresden's Georgenhof, which Parr visited in 1530, and Italian designs.

Similar buildings soon followed in Falkenberg (Niemodlin), Kreppelhof (Zamek Grodztwo) in Landeshut (Kamienna Góra), Sorau (Żary) and Plagwitz (Płakowice, now a district of Lwówek Śląski). Sgraffito appeared first in 1563 in Proskau (Proszków), altogether 300 examples are preserved to this day.

Stylistically the early buildings were connected to Bohemian and Lusatian traditions, represented by Wendel Roskopf, Benedikt Ried and Hans Lindener and were still influenced by Gothic ideas. Soon afterwards the buildings of the Comasks from Italy replaced their work. After 1560 Dutch Renaissance styles, imported by pattern-books and master builders like Hans Vredeman de Vries, replaced Italian elements. These Dutch forms were first visible at Oleśnica Castle in 1542. Notable representatives of this era were Gaspare Cuneo, Gerhardt von Amsterdam and Hans Lucas. Buildings influenced by this style were the castles in Alt Warthau (Warta Bolesławiecka) or Gießmanndorf (Gościszów) and the majority of the civic architecture of that time. Sporadically, other traditions emerged too, for example Saxon portals in Liegnitz or Bohemian roofs in Grafenort (Gorzanów) castle.

The only new development of sacred architecture in Silesia which fully adopted Mannerism was the palace chapel of Siedlisko (Carolath), commissioned by Valentin von Säbisch. His son Albrecht created the famous Protestant Churches of Peace, which were constrained by political conditions. Without tower, timber framed and built in minimal time they appeared more like commercial construction, a sparse look which was intended. In their simplicity they resembled on northern European Manierism, however they already were a creation of the baroque era.

== Silesian Baroque ==
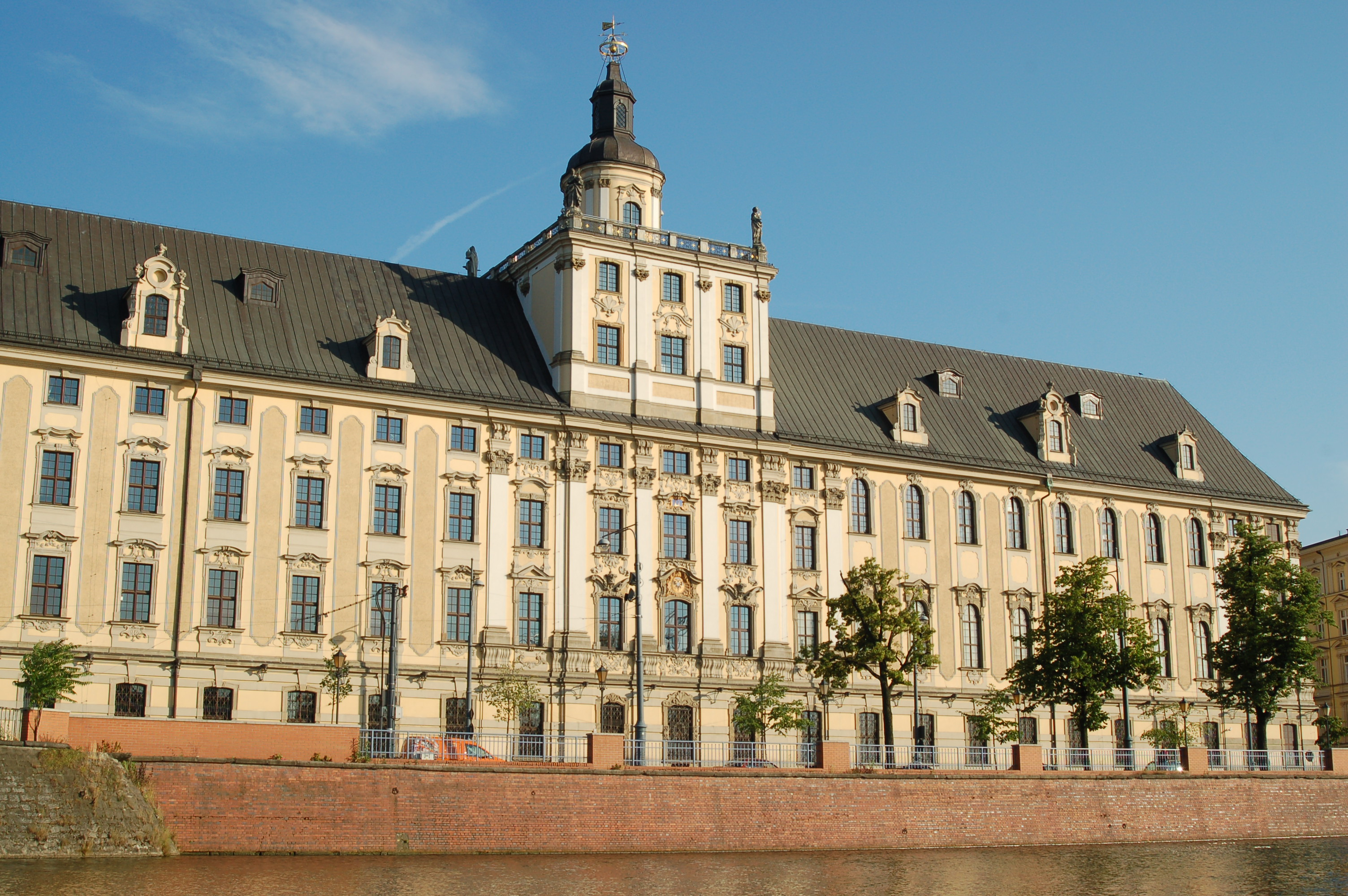
Main building of the University of Wrocław

The beginning and the end of the Baroque were marked by two wars, the Thirty Years' War and the Seven Years' War. The triumph of the Baroque architecture in Silesia was closely connected to the rise of the House of Habsburg and the Counter-Reformation, whereas its decline was marked by the import of Classicism by Prussia, the new owner of Silesia after the Seven Years' War. The religious antagonism of Protestantism and Catholicism led to a sharp contrast of a conservative Protestant Baroque which was in the defence and a vanguard and rousing Catholic Baroque which was in the offensive. The ban to build Protestant churches and the saturation of the region with secular architecture resulted in a decline of building projects. As a consequence most Baroque palaces of the 17th and 18th century were alterations of existing structures.

The destruction of the secular courtly culture by the new Polish owners after 1945 led to a widespread deterioration of palaces in Silesia, and today's remaining palaces and holdovers in museums give only a distorted impression of the Baroque era in Silesia.

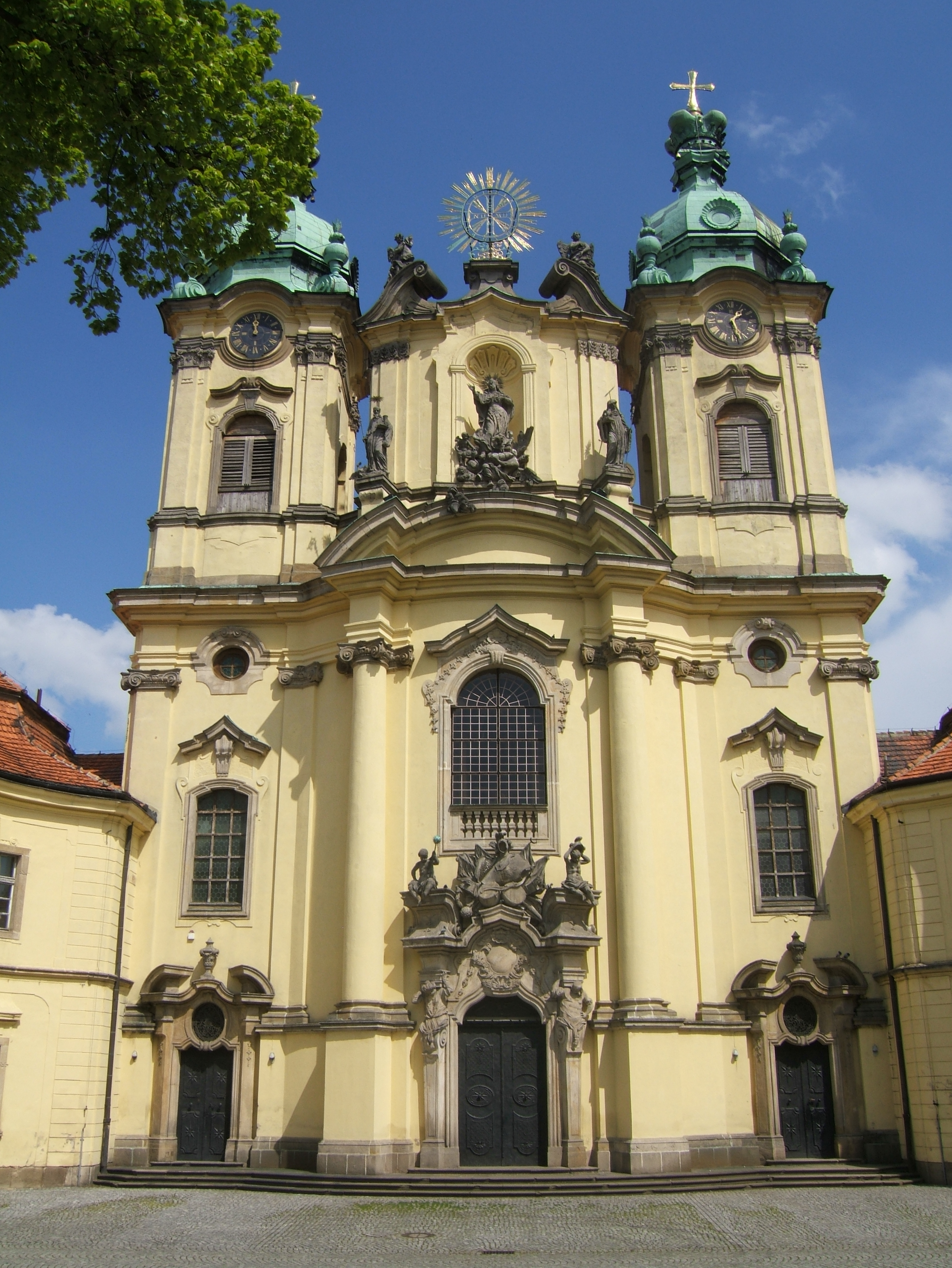
St. Hedwig's church in Legnickie Pole, 1727–31 by K. I. Dientzenhofer

Important patrons of the Baroque architecture were two bishops from Breslau: Frederick of Hesse-Darmstadt and Franz Ludwig von Pfalz-Neuburg. During their 50-year incumbency both initiated numerous artistic projects and supported a large array of artists. Cistercian monasteries with their large possession acted as important intellectual and artistic centers, and Cistercian abbots used the arts as an instrument to manifest their prince-like status. They created the conditions for a collaboration of the two workshops of Michael Willmann and Matthias Steinl, which was of pan-European importance. The Jesuits as the main supporters of the imperial Counter-Reformation enriched mainly the civic centers with their buildings, much to the aversion of the Protestant society. They were responsible for the spread of basilicas modeled after Il Gisu, stylistic vocabulary of the Bohemian Dientzenhofer family and the baroque theatricalism found for instance at Leopoldina university in Breslau. Artistically very active were also the Premonstratensians, Augustinians, Franciscans and the Benedictines, the latter being responsible for the church at Wahlstatt (Legnickie Pole) near Liegnitz, an outstanding architectural monument and one of the most famous symbols of the triumph of the church against nonbelievers.

The privileged higher Catholic nobility, often immigrated, at that time laid the base for large possessions, whereas the Protestant bourgeoisie lost its role as a patron of the architecture and compensated this loss with outstanding achievements in literature, music and science.

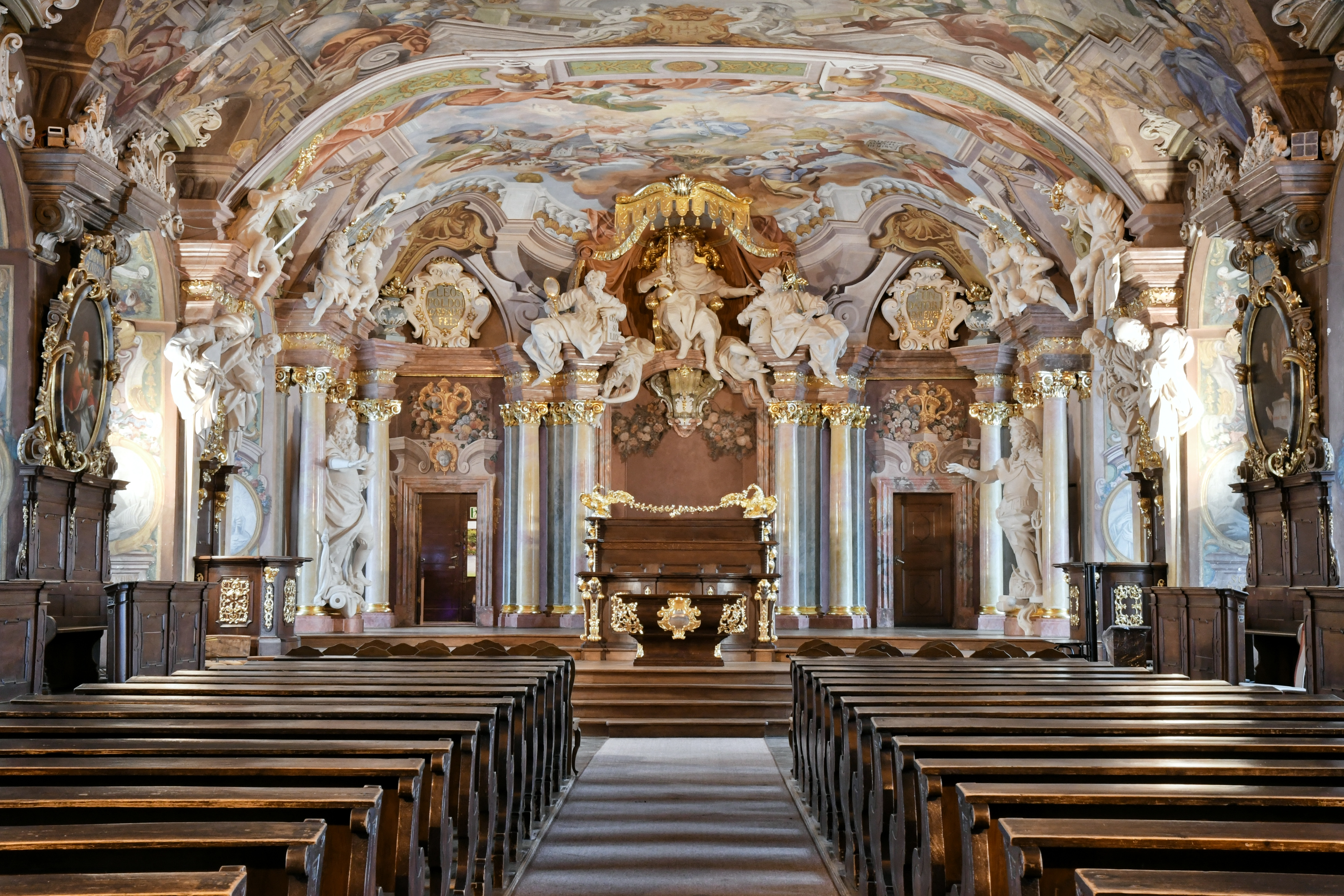
Aula Leopoldina of the University of Wrocław, glorification of the Habsburg dynasty, emperor Leopold I., sculptures by Fr.J. Mangoldt, paintings Joh.Chr. Handke, 1731–33

Characteristic for the baroque era in Silesia was the glorification of the died out Silesian Piasts and its successors, the Habsburgs. The mother of the last ruling duke of the Silesian Piasts, princess Louise of Anhalt-Dessau, built a Piast mausoleum in Liegnitz commemorating the extinct dynasty, which shows a unique program by poet Daniel Casper von Lohenstein. The Cistercians regarded themselves as keepers of the Piastic legacy and erected commemorating programs in Leubus and Grüssau (Lubiąż and Krzeszów Abbeys), but also rendered homage to the Habsburgs at the university of Breslau, in Leubus and in Lobris (Luboradz).

The early period of the baroque era (1640–80) was marked by the activity of Italian masters, which after the Thirty Years' War filled the gaps in the entire Holy Roman Empire. St. Matthias in Breslau (1654) and Cistercian churches like Grüssau (1670) were first altered, later it affected all churches. The first remodeled palaces (all around 1640) were the residences in Zülz (Biała), Żyrowa, Oberglogau (Głogówek), Palais Heberstein in Grafenort (Gorzanów) by Carlo Lurago (1653–57) and the palace in Proskau (Prószków) by G. Seregni between 1677 and 1683. The palace in Sagan, started by Albrecht von Wallenstein and later in possession of the von Lobkowicz family, was modeled after Bohemian standards. The Jesuit seminar in Neisse (1656–58) was built by Melchior Werner, who represented the first generation of Silesian architects after the war.

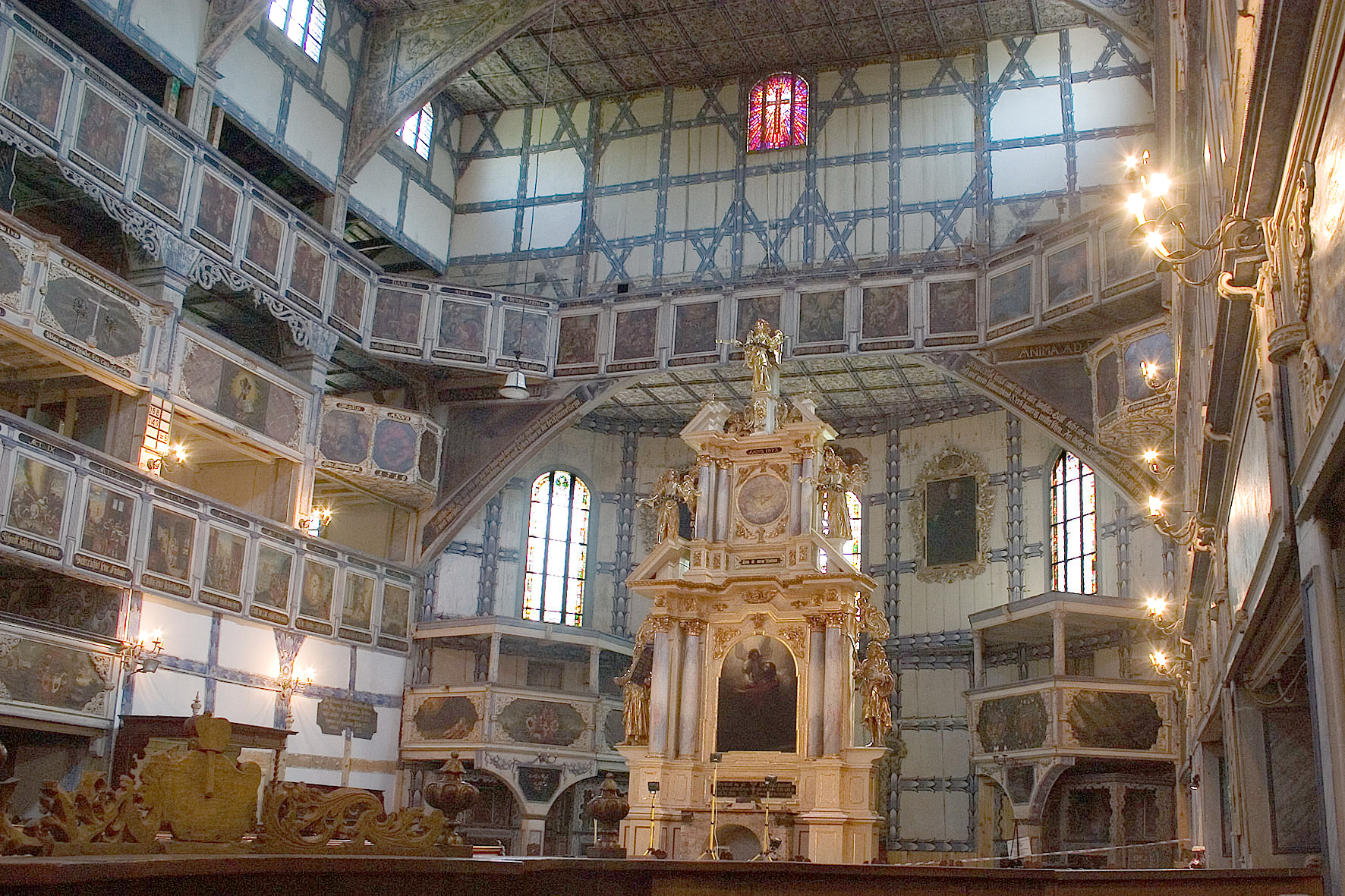
Inside the Church of Peace in Jawor, plans A.v. Säbisch, built by carpenter A. Gamper, painting probably G. Flegel, 1654–56

Important for the Protestant European architecture were the three Churches of Peace in Glogau, Jauer and Schweidnitz. Its constructor, military engineer Albrecht von Säbisch from Breslau, had to deal with a number of political constraints defined at the Peace of Westphalia. The churches should be built outside of the city walls, without stones and without a tower. The result were churches designed after Dutch and French examples, but with local traditions. A second variant of Protestant churches were so called border churches, simple buildings made of cheap materials, located outside of the borders of Silesia in the surrounding countries and used as refuges for the suppressed Silesian Protestants.

Between 1680 and 1740 the Silesian baroque entered a period of prosperity. The palace in Suhlau (Sułów), built in 1680, was the first building made with all representative stylistic elements of the baroque era. The Althans family constructed several palace ensembles in Wölfelsdorf (Wilkanów) and Mittelwalde (Międzylesie), Konrad Ernst Maximilian von Hochberg expanded castle Fürstenstein (Książ; 1718–25, carried out by F. A. Hammerschmidt and F. A. Scheffler), 10 years later Martin Frantz enlarged Kotzenau palace (Chocianów) and created one of the finest baroque garden in Silesia, and even some Palais entre cour et jardin emerged in Gröditzberg and Briese (by Johann Blasius Peintner from Austria). Entire landscape gardens however are rarely preserved and only known thanks to illustrations by Friedrich Bernhard Werner.

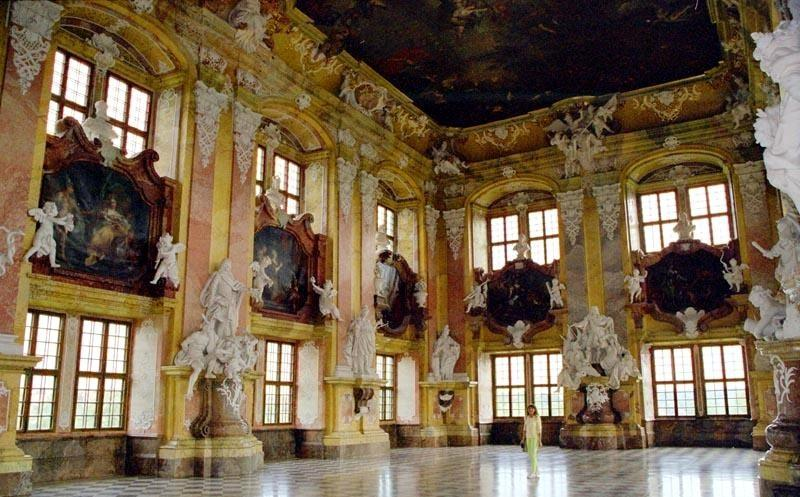
Lubiąż Abbey, Princes' Hall with paintings by Ph. Chr. Bentum, sculptures by Fr. J. Mangoldt and plastering by I. A. Provisore, 1735-37

After 1680 all great Silesian monasteries were altered. Of special importance here is the abbey of Leubus with its famous representation rooms by Michael Willmann, F.A. Scheffler, Ph. Chr. Bentum and Franz Joseph Mangoldt. St. Elisabeth chapel at the cathedral of Breslau was the most significant import of Italian inspired baroque and the last major work carried out by Italians. 30 years later Johann Bernhard Fischer von Erlach created the pendant, the electors chapel, which already anticipated neo-classical ideas.

The ideas of the Bohemian Baroque were spread by members of the Dientzenhofer family and its students. The first church of this type was the Jesuit church in Liegnitz, built by Christoph and Kilian Ignaz Dientzenhofer between 1714 and 1727. Later works can be found in Neiße, Liebenthal (Lubomierz), Leubus or Brieg. They were mostly propagated by Silesian Christoph Hackner from Jauer, Martin Frantz from Reval/Tallinn and his students Karl Martin Frantz from Liegnitz (Legnica) and Johann Innocenz Töpper from Neustadt (Prudnik).

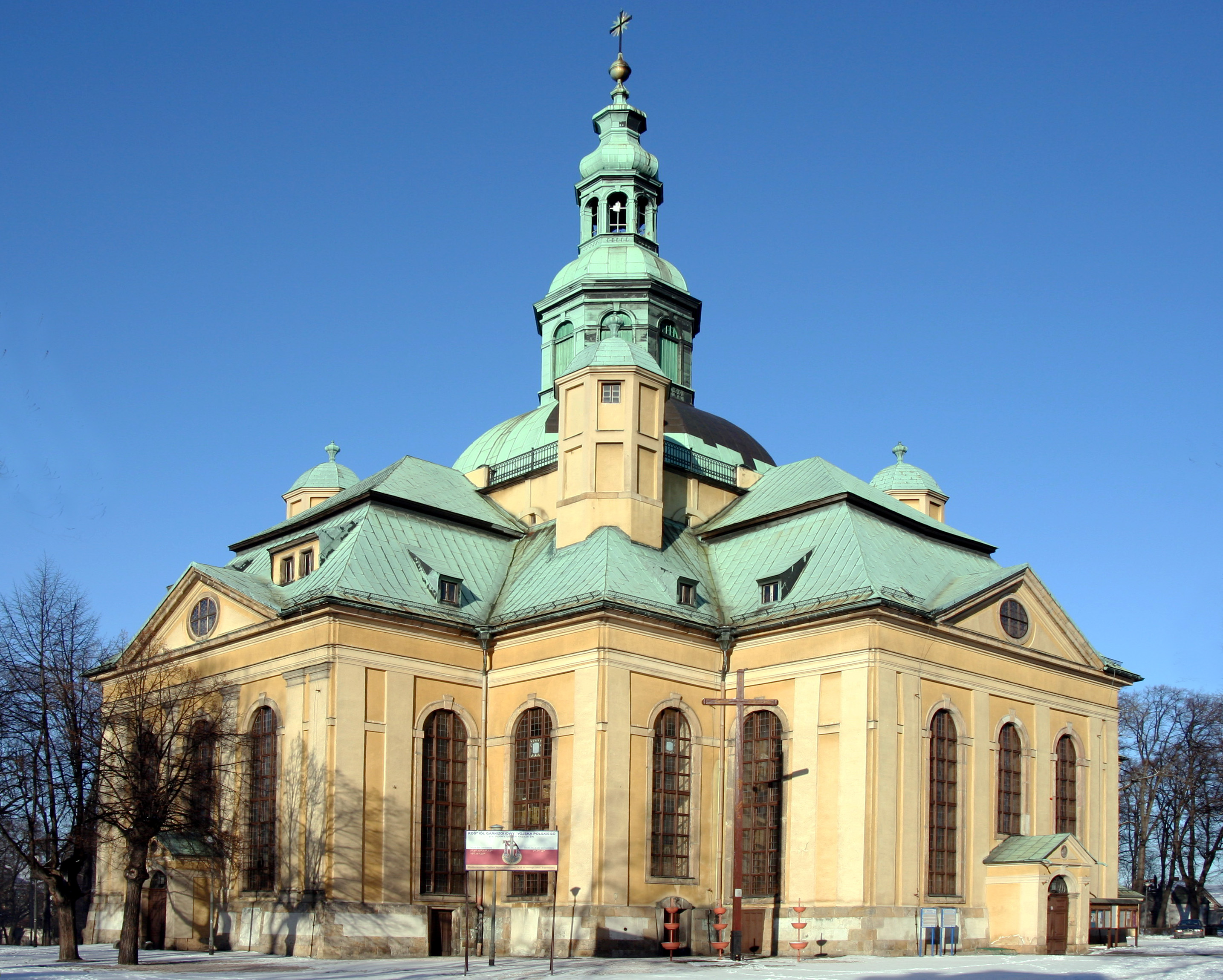
Exaltation of the Holy Cross Church in Jelenia Góra, built 1707-18 by M. Frantz as the Grace Church (German: Gnadenkirche)

A reason for the intensified construction activity in the first half of the 18th century was the implementation of the Treaty of Altranstädt, which demanded the restitution of 104 and the erection of 6 new Protestant churches, the so-called Gnadenkirchen (churches of mercy). The abolishment of building regulation except for the erection outside of the townwalls caused the heterogeneity of this group. The churches in Sagan, Freystadt (Kożuchów) and Militsch (Milicz) were timber-framed, the churches in Hirschberg and Landeshut by Martin Frantz modeled after Katarina Church in Stockholm, whereas the Protestant church in Teschen (Cieszyn, Těšín), modeled after Catholic Jesuit churches, was an exception.

The biggest metropolitan ensembles were carried out in Neiße, Breslau and Liegnitz. Important palaces, which combined residential and professional requirements, in Breslau were built by the family von Hatzfeld, von Spätgen, Hornes and von Schreyvogel, the latter being designed by Johann Lukas von Hildebrandt. The biggest secular urban developments of that time were the Ritterakademie (knights academy) in Liegnitz, built for aristocratic children of both religious conviction, and the destroyed episcopalian spital in Neiße. Almost no city hall was constructed during the baroque era, and few saved their baroque rebuildings.

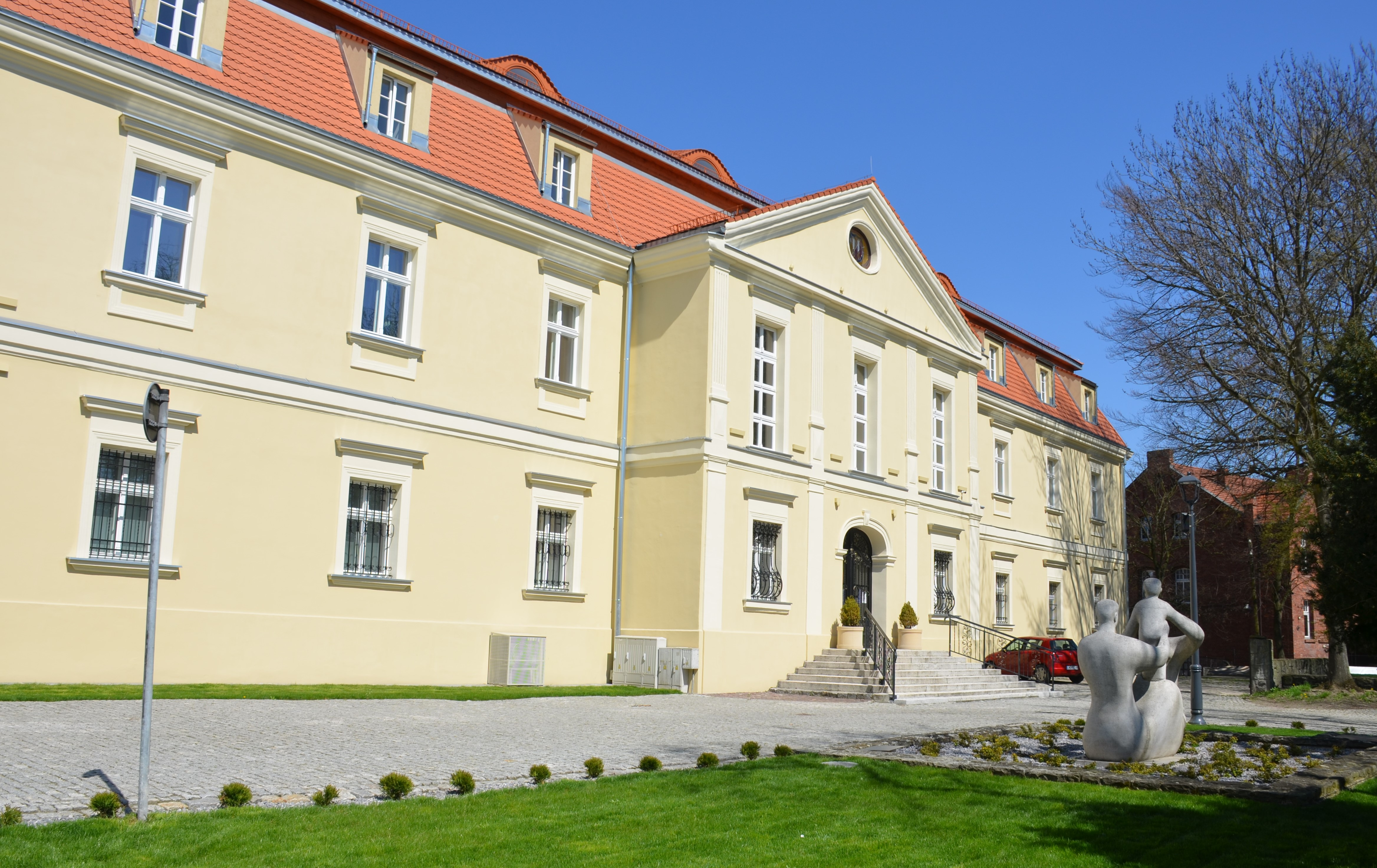
Palace in Wodzisław Śląski from 1745 as the first neoclassical style object in Silesia

The annexation by Prussia in 1742 during the first Silesian war marked the beginning of the end of the Baroque era in Silesia. The orientation towards the new political and artistical center in Berlin brought changes in the organization of building activities along. New artists from Prussia took the place of dying Silesian artists (Tausch †1731, Peintner †1732, Hackner †1741, Frantz †1742, Frisch †1745), for instance G.L. Schirmeister in Oels (Oleśnica), J.M. Pohlmann in Oppeln (Opole) or Chr.Fr. Schultze in Breslau. The newly created building inspection department limited the importance of Silesian guilds and adjusted construction plans.

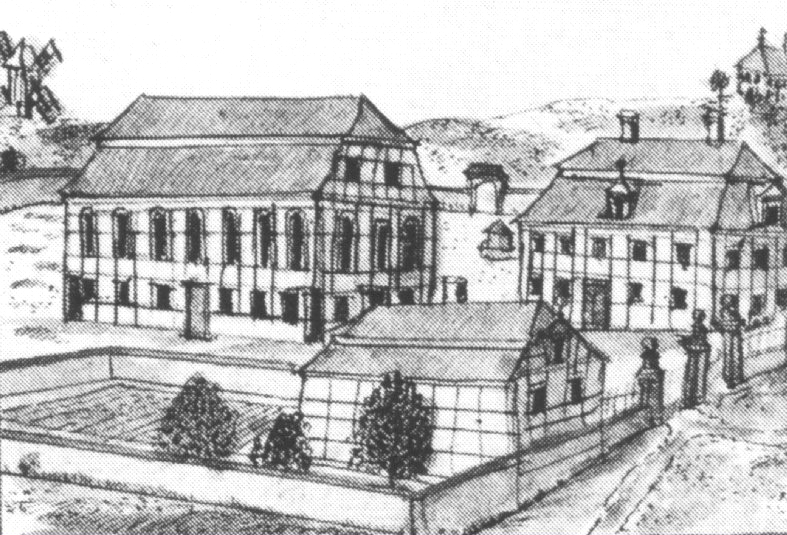
Modest Protestant church in Primkenau (Polish: Przemków), drawn by Friedrich Bernhard Werner, church not preserved

Between the First and Second Silesian War almost only magazines, barracks, fortification and Protestant churches were built. Towns like Cosel (Koźle, now a district of Kędzierzyn-Koźle), Brieg, Breslau, Glogau, Neiße and Schweidnitz were converted to fortresses. Carlsruhe (Pokój) was the first of a number of Frederician urban foundations, modelled after Karlsruhe in Baden. The liberated Protestant population built large quantities of modest churches in the first years of Prussian rule, which were portrayed by Friedrich Bernhard Werner. The most prestigious project of that time was the construction of the castle church in Breslau, which was remodeled by Carl Gotthard Langhans and became the prototype of all later classical Protestant churches. The final say of the Catholics in Silesia was the monastery complex of the Cistercians in Grüssau (1774–90).

The symbol of the changes and the first palace construction after the second half of the 18th century became the royal residence in Breslau (1750-53 by Joh. Boumann d.Ä.), which integrated the palace of the family von Spätgen and was a mix of Frederician rococo and classical components. Friedrich Wilhelm von Seydlitz, commander of Frederick's army, erected a Maison de plaisance in Minkowsky (Minkowskie) which was akin to Sanssouci, and the palace of family von Maltzan in Militsch was modeled after the New Palace in Potsdam.

== Neoclassicism and Historicism ==
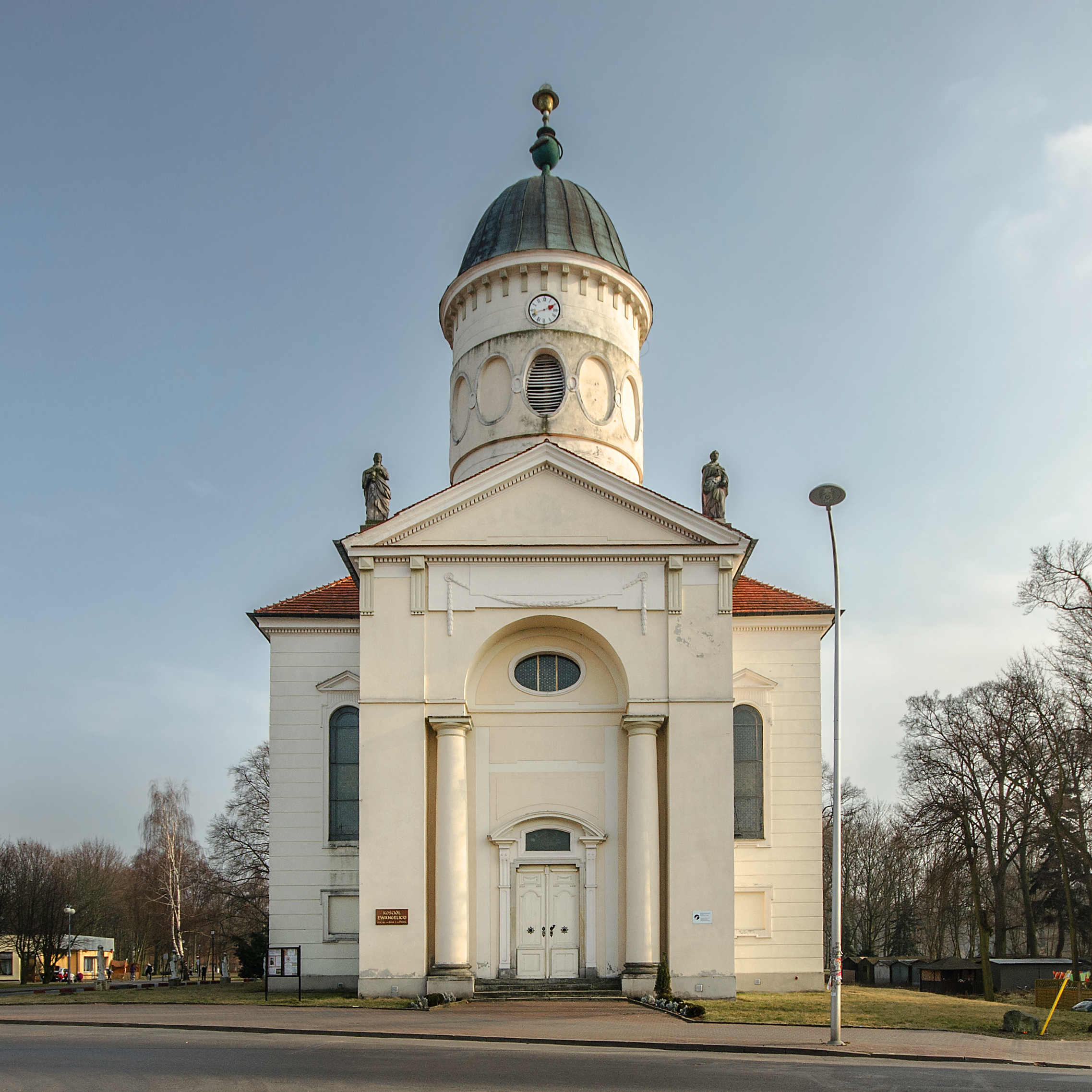
Neoclassical evangelical church in Syców, 1785 by K. G. Langhans

After the Treaty of Hubertusburg, a long-lasting phase of political and economic stabilization led to building activities which lasted until the defeat of Prussia in 1806. The destroyed cities were rebuilt, Upper Silesia became industrialized and many defensive fortifications were put up. In 1775 Silesia was split into two separate construction departments, Breslau and Glogau, which were headed by fully independent construction managers (Oberbaudirektoren). The most important of these managers, Karl Gotthard Langhans, developed its own unique neo-classical style, which was of European importance.

The sacral architecture was now dominated by the Protestant church. After 1763 the small modest churches of the past were gradually abandoned and large monumental churches were built. Groundbreaking for the development of these churches were the churches in Cosel by Joh.M. Pohlmann and K.G. Langhans and in Polnisch Wartenberg (Syców) by K.G. Langhans in 1785. The new standards of these neo-classical churches were soon adopted by the churches in Waldenburg (Wałbrzych), Reichenbach (Dzierżoniów) and Münsterberg (Ziębice). The building activities of the Catholic Church stagnated until the mid 19th century.

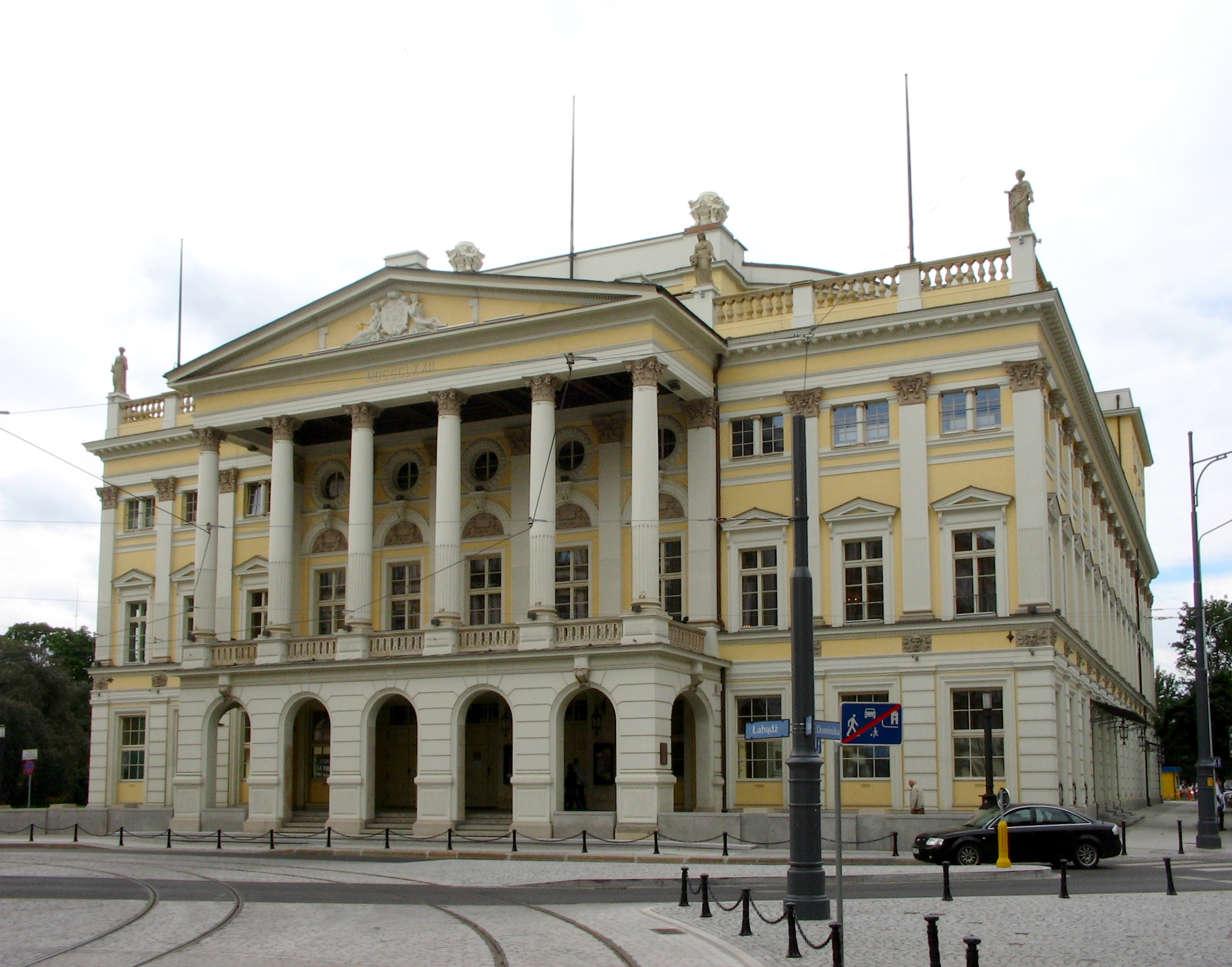
Neoclassical Wrocław Opera House by Carl Ferdinand Langhans, 1839-41

The residential architecture between 1740 and 1806 was marked by dynamic changes regarding styles and types. New town palaces however were rarely built. The most important one was Palais Hatzfeldt in Breslau, one of the first neo-classical buildings in Europe, designed in 1764 by I. Ganevale and K.G. Langhans. Other palaces adopted the new style after 1770. The public initiatives affected mainly military buildings: monumental fortifications in Silberberg (Fort Srebrna Góra), Neiße and Glatz (Kłodzko Fortress) as well as new barracks in Breslau and Brieg. According to the welfare policy of Frederick II of Prussia new hospitals and workhouses were erected (Kreuzburg, Breslau), and with the beginning industrialization of Upper Silesia entire residential developments were planned.

New administration structures were adopted after the Prussian ministry for Silesia was closed in 1808 and the reforms by Heinrich Friedrich Karl vom und zum Stein and Karl August von Hardenberg were implemented. From now on every building project had to be accepted by the building inspection department, which itself was under the control of the royal police headquarters. Every town appointed its municipal architect and local building deputation controlled the technical aspects of every project. These principles were in effect until 1900.

After 1820 positive results of these reforms became visible as a new period of building activity began. Most of these activities were now carried out in the cities, which became dominant in the shaping of Silesia's architectural landscape. Dozens of theaters, houses for different associations, schools, hospitals or asylums were built. The most important artistical center was Breslau, and the most important Silesian architect until 1840 was Carl Ferdinand Langhans, son of Carl Gotthard and creator of the exchange, the theater, the loge "Friedrich zum goldenen Zepter" in Breslau and the theater in Liegnitz. A new type of apartment buildings began to evolve and the rich bourgeoisie began to live in large villas at the outskirts of the cities.

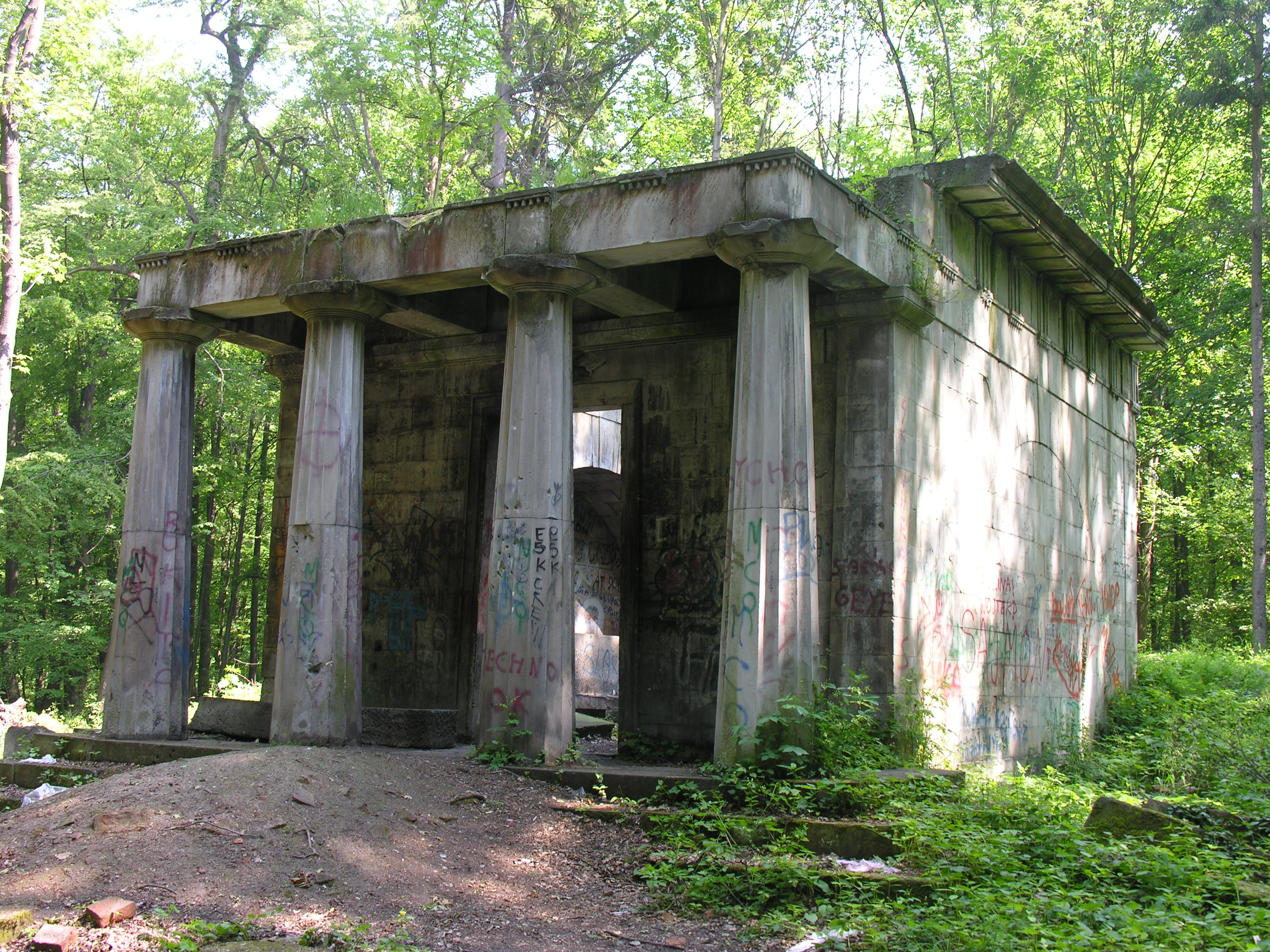
Von Hoym Mausoleum in the park of the palace in Brzeg Dolny, by Gr. Gilly, 1800-03

The architecture of that time was marked by a broad mix of several neo-classical styles, from Palladianism, revolutionary Neoclassicism (Hoym mausoleum by Friedrich Gilly) in Dyhernfurth (Brzeg Dolny) or Palais Hohenlohe with the construction of the palace in Kamenz by Karl Friedrich Schinkel. Summer residences for the king of Prussia and his court in Hirschberg valley were the most important phenomenon in the palace architecture, where more than 30 palaces, castles and manors formed a cultural landscape of outstanding importance. In the cities the town walls were razed (first 1807 in Breslau) and replaced by greens, among them the first public parks.

The fourth decade of the 19th century was a turning point in the history of the Silesian architecture. Frederick William IV of Prussia ascended the throne in 1840, Karl Friedrich Schinkel died in 1841 and Karl Ferdinand Langhans finally moved to Berlin. Neo-Classizism was slowly replaced by Historism, the Silesian architecture linked more and more with Berlin and with the rise of the Wilhelmine empire the local architecture became fully dominated by German art movements. Neo-Renaissance was soon adopted in two varieties, Italian and Northern- German, the latter being promoted as the "national style". This German Renaissance was mainly used at state-run building projects, for instance post offices. Palaces and self-governments were often built in neo-Baroque forms, whereas neo-Romanesque did not become popular in Silesia.

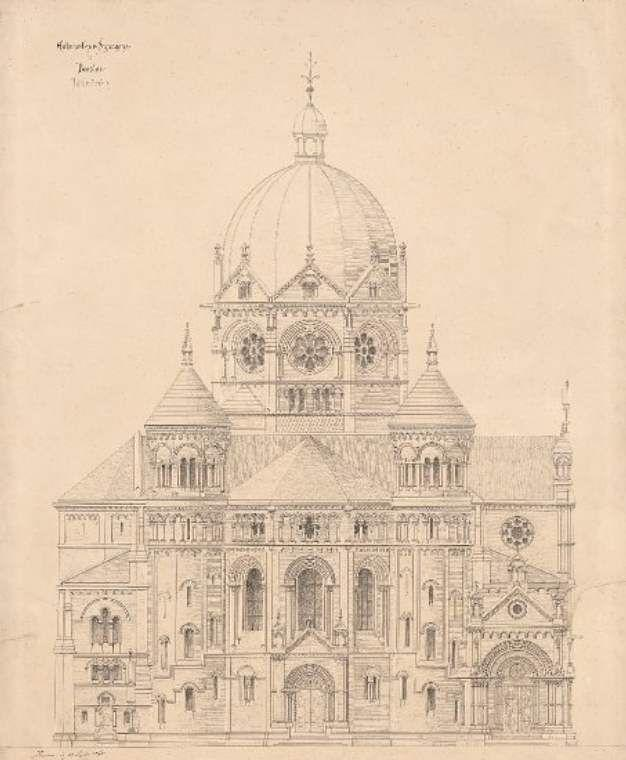
Synagogue "Am Anger" (Polish: "Na Wygonie") in Wrocław by Edwin Oppler, 1872

The departure of Karl Ferdinand Langhans left a gap which was soon filled by architects from Berlin. The time until 1914 was now marked by a peculiar rivalry between the architects from Silesia and Berlin. Communal and private building projects carried out by Silesian architects clearly cited local traditions, whereas governmental building projects dominated by architects from Berlin showed stylistic concepts without Silesian characteristics. The state (king, emperor) became the client with the most prestige, on his initiative many administrational buildings (regional councils, archives), prisons, courts of justice, police buildings and academies were constructed. As the leader of the Protestant church the king also founded many churches. The Catholic Church was still one of the biggest principals, especially in Upper Silesia. In 1883 a bishopric building officer was created, the first one being Josef Ebers. Not only churches were erected, but also hospitals, schools and many other buildings; approximately 2.000 Protestant and Catholic institutions in the entire 19th century. After 1850 the Jews became the third important ecclesiastic client and built large and representative synagogues which rivaled the churches of the other denominations. The most spectacular example was the synagogue "Am Anger" in Breslau, constructed by Edwin Oppler in 1872. They also built many hospitals and care homes. The religious equalization of Protestants, Catholics and Jews, which was typical for the second half of the 19th century in Prussia, was now mirrored by the architectural landscape of Silesia.

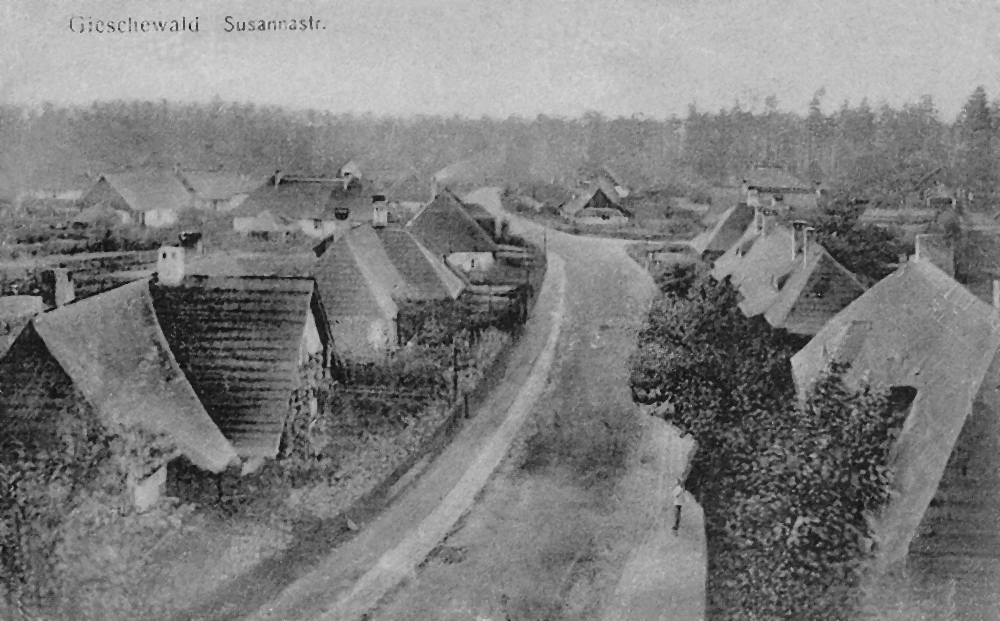
Gieschewald (Polish: Giszowiec), workers colony, by Georg and Emil Zillmann

Thanks to the Prussian reforms in the beginning of the 19th century the bourgeoisie became the dominant group and replaced the patriciate, which partially left their town palaces and concentrated on big industrial investments in Upper Silesia. The bourgeoisie also became the foremost patrons and consumers of the arts and initiated the construction of many theaters, museums or galleries, in addition they also gave an impetus to the beautification of the cities with parks and promenades. Their biggest achievement however was the construction of countless apartment buildings, which led to a rapid growth of the cities and the transition of Breslau to a metropolis. At the same time the division of the suburbs into living spaces for workmen, craftsmen, industry and rich middle classes took place. This however occurred only in Lower Silesia. Most towns in Upper Silesia did not have an old town center but often only one street, and they also did not have suburbs but chaotically scattered small apartment buildings for workers (so called familoki), which were closely connected to the local coal mines. An exception was the workers colony in Nickischschacht and especially Gieschewald, built by Berlin architects Georg and Emil Zillmann for Gesellschaft Georg v. Giesche's Erben.

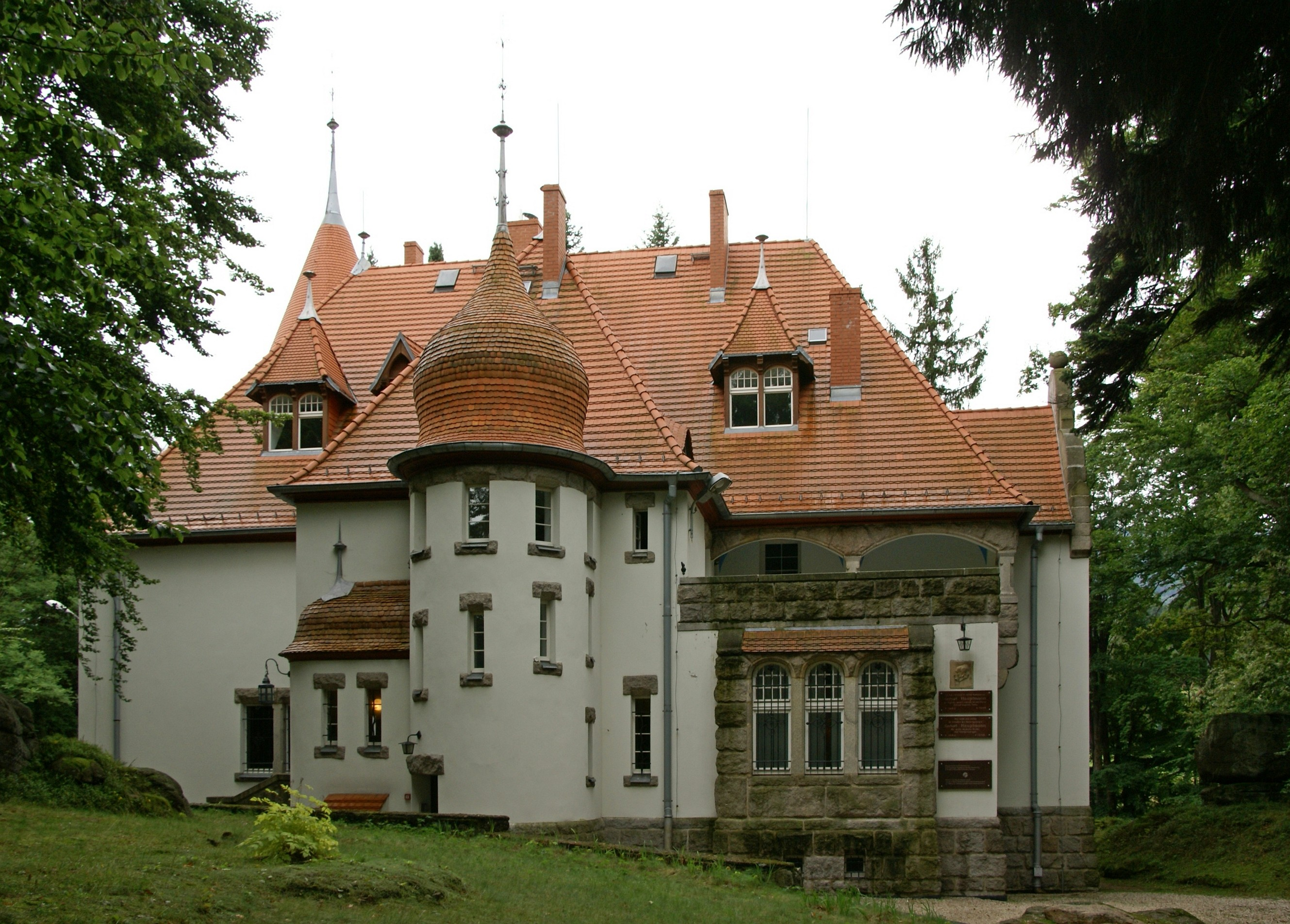
Gerhart Hauptmann Villa

The opposite to the Upper Silesian industrial small towns represented the Lower Silesian spas in the Sudetes mountain range. Silesia was without a doubt scenically the most beautiful part of the Kingdom of Prussia, which was the reason for the speedy development of several railway lines to the spas at the foothill of the mountains in the second half of the 19th century. These villages and towns, with its exclusive sanatoriums and hotels, were a prestigious field of work for architects from Breslau, but some of them, like Görbersdorf (the Silesian Davos), were also carried out by non- Silesians like Edwin Oppler from Hanover (although he was born in Silesia). After the royal court left Hirschberg valley (which is also a part of the Sudetes) the region became attractive for a number of famous people from the German intelligentsia, among them Nobel Prize winner Gerhart Hauptmann, whose villa in Agnetendorf (Jagniątków) was designed by one of the best architects from Berlin, Hans Grisebach, or political economist Werner Sombart, who resided in a villa in Schreiberhau by Fritz Schumacher from Hamburg.

== Castles, palaces ==
- Gliwice Castle
- Pszczyna Castle
- Sielecki Castle
- Książ
- Goldstein Palace

== See also ==
- Gliwice Radio Tower
- Reichenbacher Tower (de:Reichenbacher Turm)
- Dicker Tower (de:Dicker Turm)
