= 5318 Dientzenhofer =

Main-belt asteroid

Discovery
- Discovered by: A. Mrkos
- Discovery site: Kleť Obs.
- Discovery date: 21 April 1985

Designations
- Named after: Christoph Dientzenhofer; Kilian Ignaz Dientzenhofer (German Baroque architects)
- Alternative designations: 1985 HG_{1} · 1983 UL_{1} 1985 JZ · 1988 CX_{2}
- Minor planet category: main-belt · (inner) background · Flora

Orbital characteristics
- Epoch 23 March 2018 (JD 2458200.5)
- Uncertainty parameter 0
- Observation arc: 46.48 yr (16,975 d)
- Aphelion: 2.5941 AU
- Perihelion: 1.9861 AU
- Semi-major axis: 2.2901 AU
- Eccentricity: 0.1327
- Orbital period (sidereal): 3.47 yr (1,266 d)
- Mean anomaly: 222.61°
- Mean motion: 0° 17^{m} 3.84^{s} / day
- Inclination: 3.3096°
- Longitude of ascending node: 107.64°
- Argument of perihelion: 54.418°

Physical characteristics
- Mean diameter: 5.41 km (calculated); 6.267±0.116 km
- Synodic rotation period: 8.062±0.001 h 8.062±0.002 h
- Geometric albedo: 0.215±0.063; 0.24 (assumed)
- Spectral type: SMASS = Sk
- Absolute magnitude (H): 13.29±0.23; 13.3; 13.5

5318 Dientzenhofer, provisional designation 1985 HG_{1}, is a stony background asteroid from the inner regions of the asteroid belt, approximately 6 kilometers (3.7 miles) in diameter. It was discovered on 21 April 1985, by Czech astronomer Antonín Mrkos at the Kleť Observatory in Bohemia, Czech Republic. The transitional S-type asteroid has a rotation period of 8.06 hours. It was named after the German Baroque architects Christoph and Kilian Ignaz Dientzenhofer.

== Orbit and classification ==
Dientzenhofer is a non-family asteroid of the main belt's background population when applying the hierarchical clustering method to its proper orbital elements. Based on osculating Keplerian orbital elements, the asteroid has also been classified as a member of the Flora family (402), a giant asteroid family and the largest family of stony asteroids in the main-belt.

The asteroid orbits the Sun in the inner main-belt at a distance of 2.0–2.6 AU once every 3 years and 6 months (1,266 days; semi-major axis of 2.29 AU). Its orbit has an eccentricity of 0.13 and an inclination of 3° with respect to the ecliptic. The body's observation arc begins with a precovery taken at Palomar Observatory in May 1971, or 14 years prior to its official discovery observation at Klet.

== Physical characteristics ==
In the Bus–Binzel SMASS classification, Dientzenhofer is an Sk-subtype, that transitions from the stony S-type to the uncommon K-type asteroids.

=== Rotation period ===
In 2016, two rotational lightcurves of Dientzenhofer were obtained from photometric observations by Italian astronomers at the Eurac Observatory (C62), Astronomical Observatory University of Siena (K54) and Carpione Observatory (K49). Lightcurve analysis gave an identical rotation period of 8.062 hours with a brightness amplitude of 0.70 and 0.84 magnitude, respectively (U=3-/3), indicative of a non-spheroidal shape.

=== Diameter and albedo ===
According to the survey carried out by the NEOWISE mission of NASA's Wide-field Infrared Survey Explorer, Dientzenhofer measures 6.267 kilometers in diameter and its surface has an albedo of 0.215, while the Collaborative Asteroid Lightcurve Link assumes an albedo of 0.24 – derived from 8 Flora, the parent body of the Flora family – and calculates a diameter of 5.41 kilometers based on an absolute magnitude of 13.5.

== Naming ==
This minor planet was named after Christoph Dientzenhofer (1655–1722) and his son Kilian Ignaz Dientzenhofer (1689–1751), members of the Dientzenhofer family of architects. Christoph and Kilian Ignaz are known for the churches and monasteries built in Prague during the 17th and 18th century in the Bohemian Baroque architecture style. The official naming citation was published by the Minor Planet Center on 9 January 2001 (M.P.C. 41934).
