= Goldstein Palace =

Palace in Poland

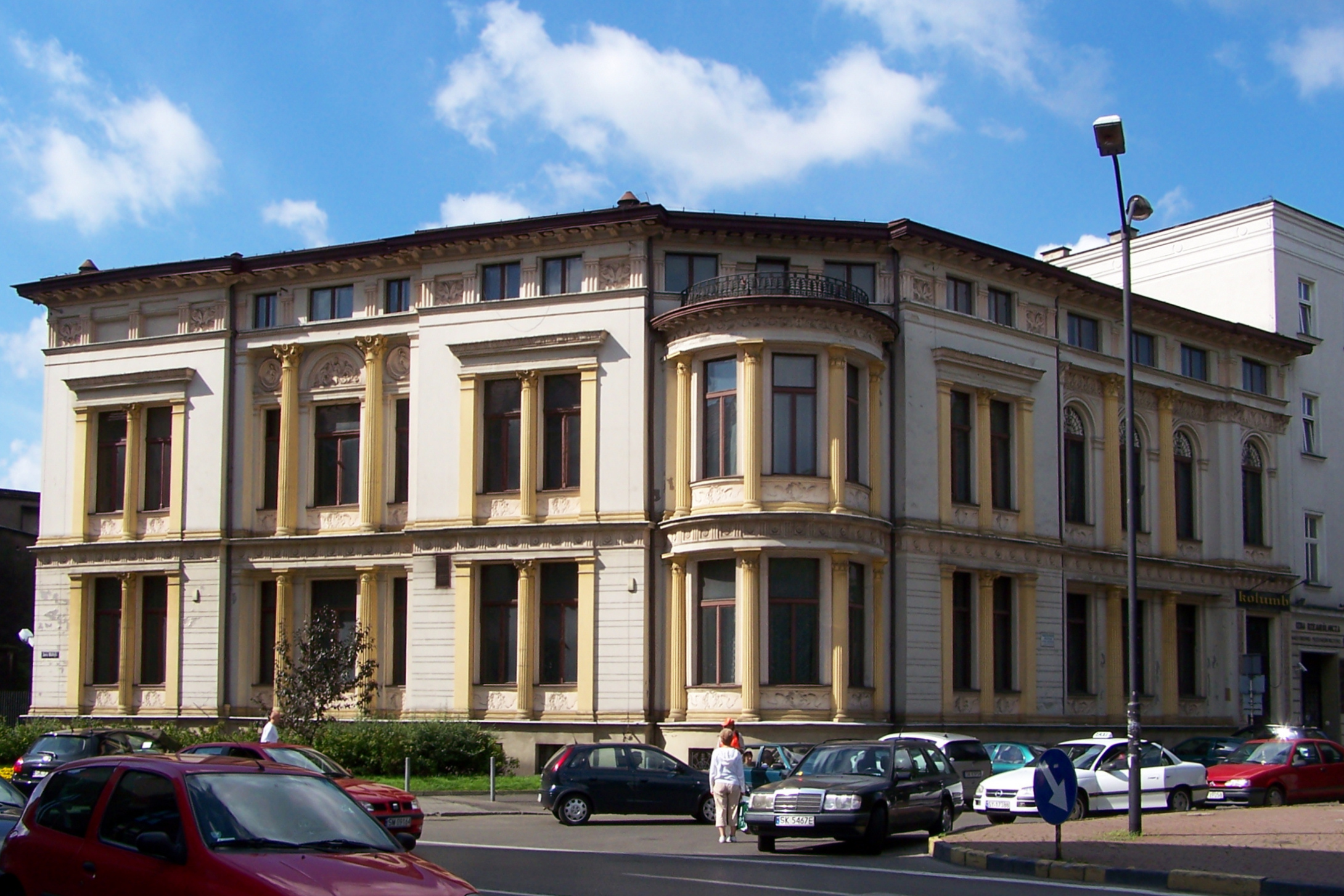
Goldstein Palace in Katowice

The Pałac Goldsteinów or Goldstein Palace is neo-Renaissance palace, which was built by two brothers, Abraham and Joseph Goldstein. It is located in Katowice, Silesia, Poland, at the west end of the city centre, at 50°15′33″N 19°0′47″E.

The palace is representative for the building style of second part of the 1870s. Front elevations and interior staircases are decorated in typical neo-Renaissance ornamentation. The opulent use of marble and sandstone testifies of the owner's wealth. It has two floors. On every floor there are lords’ room, kitchen, bathroom, pantry and two rooms for staff.

The Goldstein brothers owned sawmills in multiple cities in Poland, also in Katowice, on the background of palace. After a fire burned down the Katowice sawmill in 1892, the Goldstein brothers, because of heavy losses, switched their main business to Wrocław. The Estate was sold to the firm "Kohlen Produzenten Georg Von Giesches Erben". Before the Second World War, the local Chamber of Commerce was located in the building. From 1952 until 1990, the building housed the Towarzystwo Przyjaźni Polsko-Radzieckiej (Fellowship of Polish-Soviet friendship) and the Przyjaźń (friendship) cinema. From 1960 to 1970 in the basements was a vanguard theater named "12a". There also was a restaurant "Kolumb" in the building, but currently it is undergoing reconstruction to become a Urząd Stanu Cywilnego (Registry Office) in 2007. The owner of the Goldstein Palace is City of Katowice.

The architect of the building is unknown, but historians suspect him to be from Berlin.
