= Dientzenhofer family =

- Origin: Bohemia

Dientzenhofer is the name of a family of German architects, who were among the leading builders in Bohemian and German Baroque.

== Architects ==
- Georg Dientzenhofer, a poor mountain peasant & wife Barbara (Thanner) had five sons and two grandsons who became famous architects.
  - Georg Dientzenhofer (1643–1689), prominent German architect
  - Wolfgang Dientzenhofer (1648–1706), prominent German architect
  - Christoph Dientzenhofer (1655–1722), prominent architect of Bohemian Baroque
    - Kilian Ignaz Dientzenhofer (1689–1751), prominent architect of Bohemian Baroque
  - Leonhard Dientzenhofer (1660–1707; also: Johann Leonhard), prominent German architect (Banz Abbey) with brother Johann
  - Johann Dientzenhofer (1663–1726), prominent German architect
    - Justus Heinrich Dientzenhofer (1702–1744), prominent German architect

== Other Dientzenhofer ==
- Wolfgang Dinzenhofer (1678–1747) from Plankenhäusel in Au near Aibling, did probably learn at another Wolfgang Dientzenhofer in Amberg, according to documents of the local Salesian monastery. Afterwards, he built several churches in Oberbayern, in Götting, Kirchdorf bei Nußdorf am Inn, Flintsbach etc.
- Christoph Dinzenhofer (1681–1722) from Pfraundorf, was a cousin of the architect brothers, and also constructor.
- In 1631, an Abraham Dintzenhofer is recorded in the "Preßburger Bücher des ehrsamen Handwerks der Maurer- und Steinmetzen", the records of the constructor guild in Bratislava.

== Gallery ==
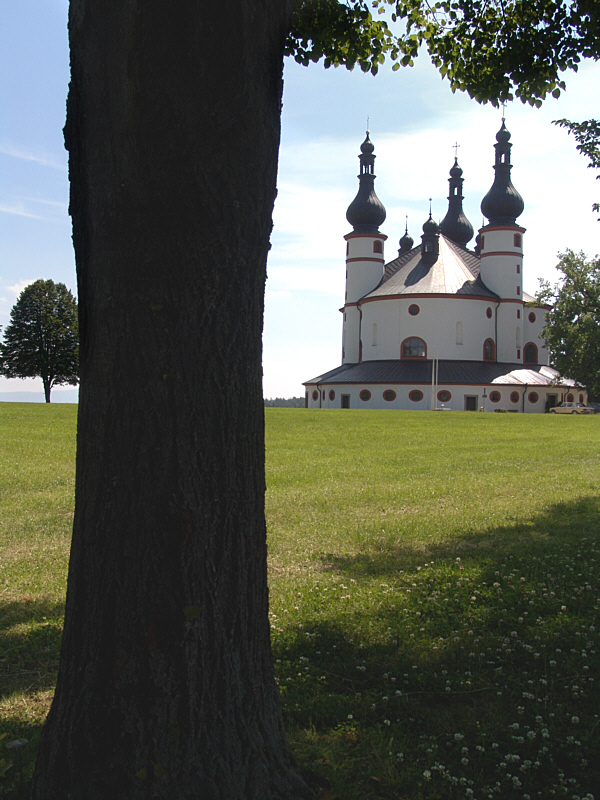
Georg Dientzenhofers Masterwork: Kappl near Waldsassen

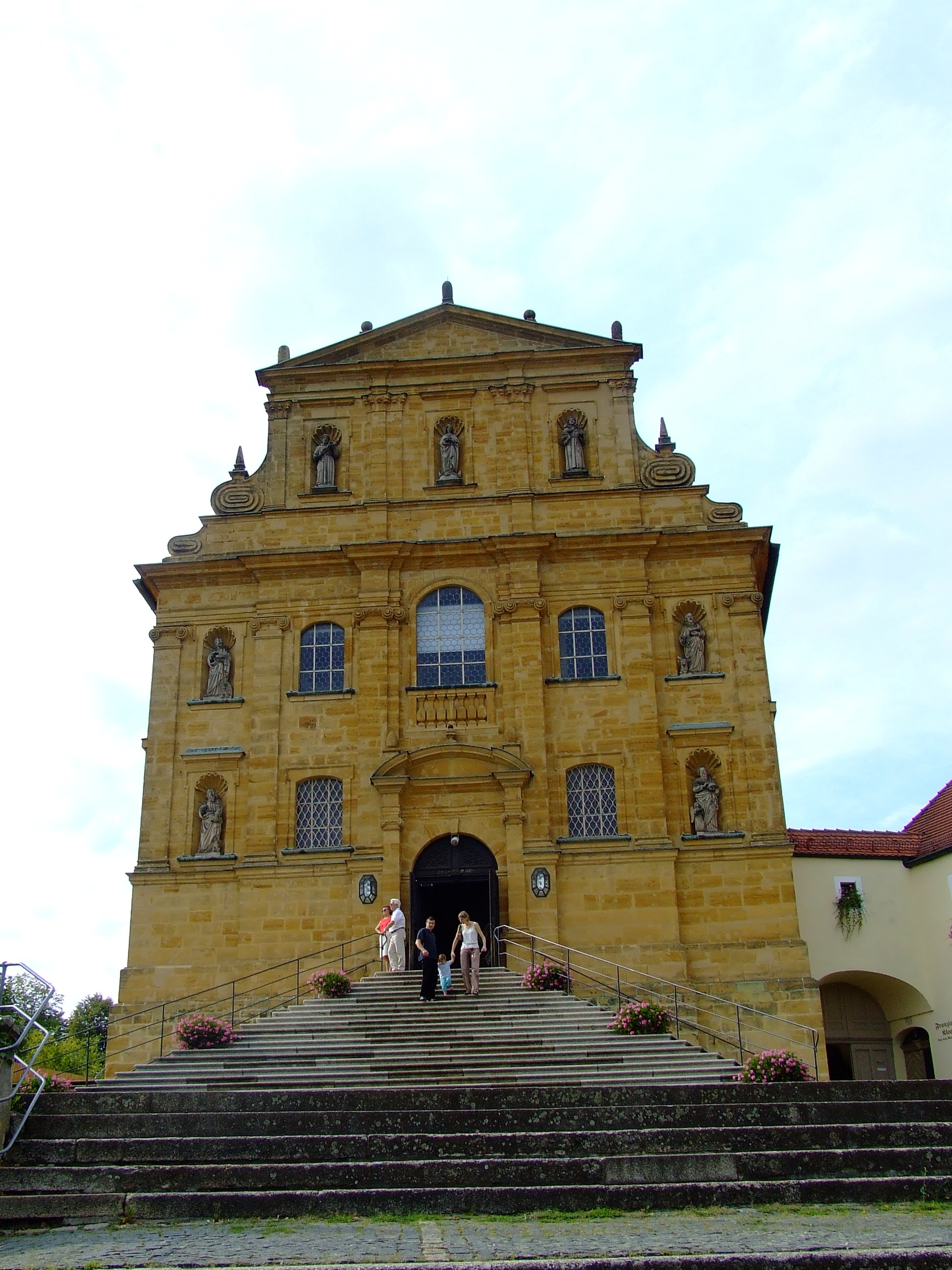
Wallfahrtskirche Maria Hilf in Amberg by Wolfgang Dietzenhofer

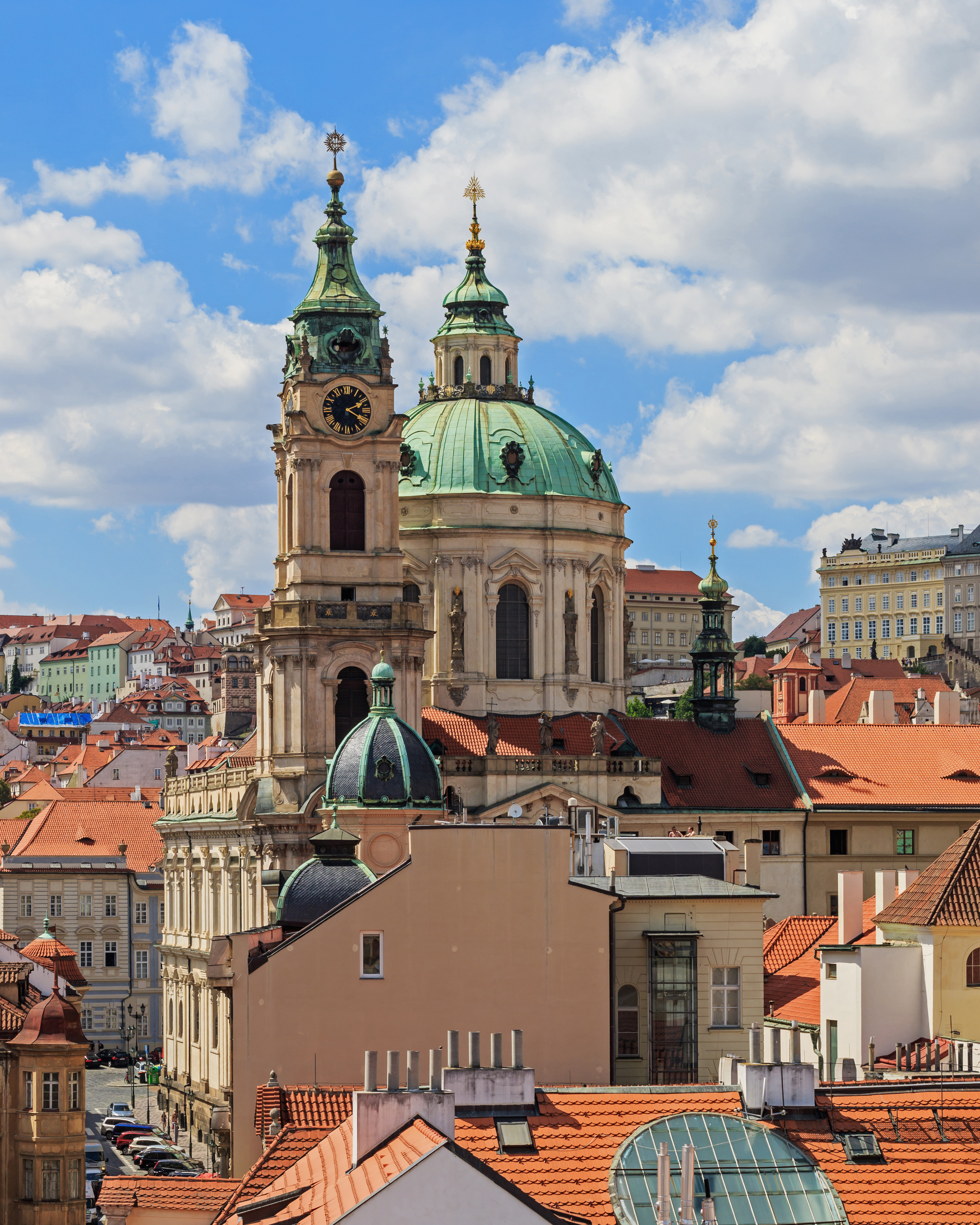
The Church of St. Nicolas in Prague by Christoph and Kilian Ignaz Dientzenhofer

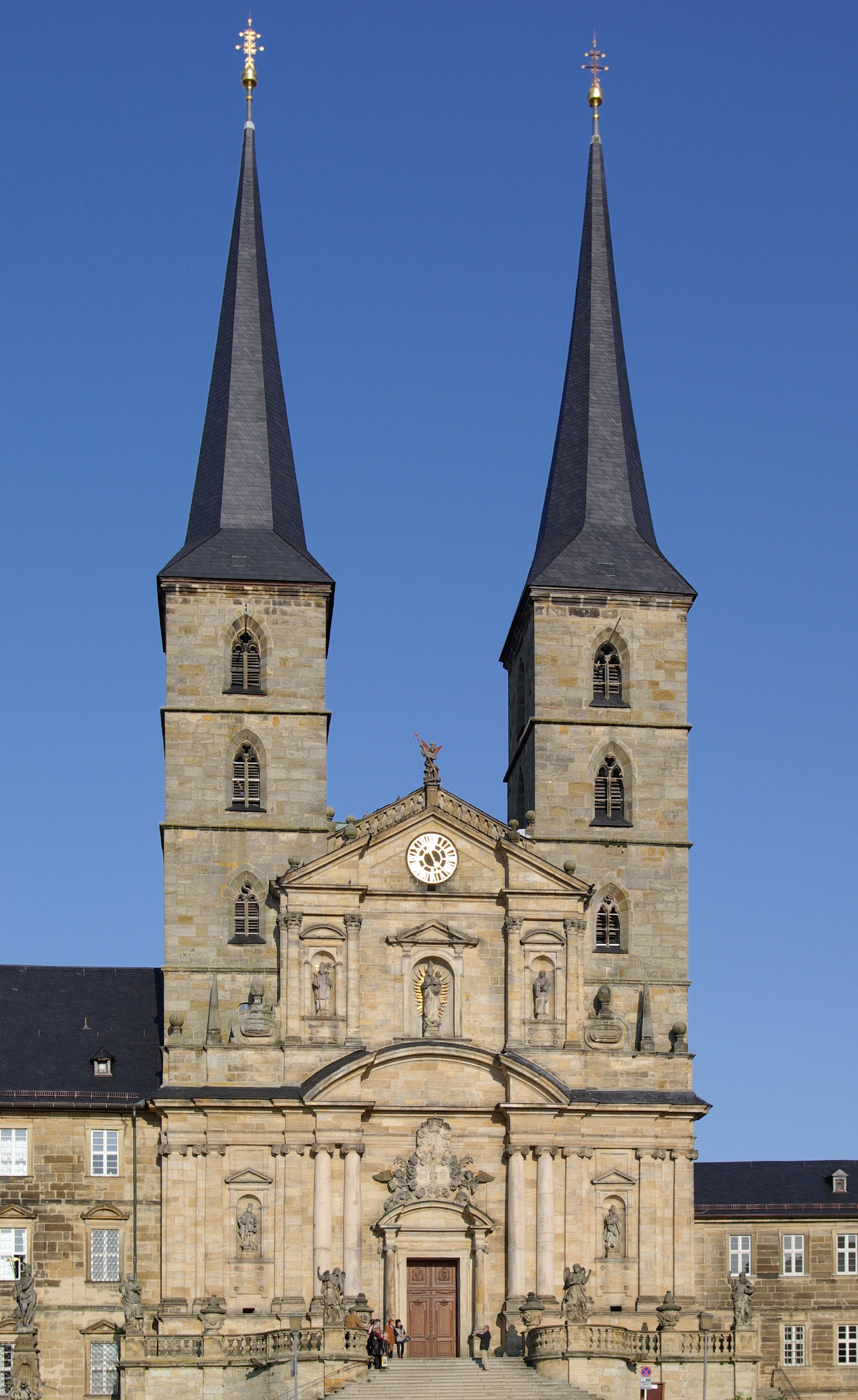
Facade of the monastery church St. Michael in Bamberg by Leonhard Dientzenhofer

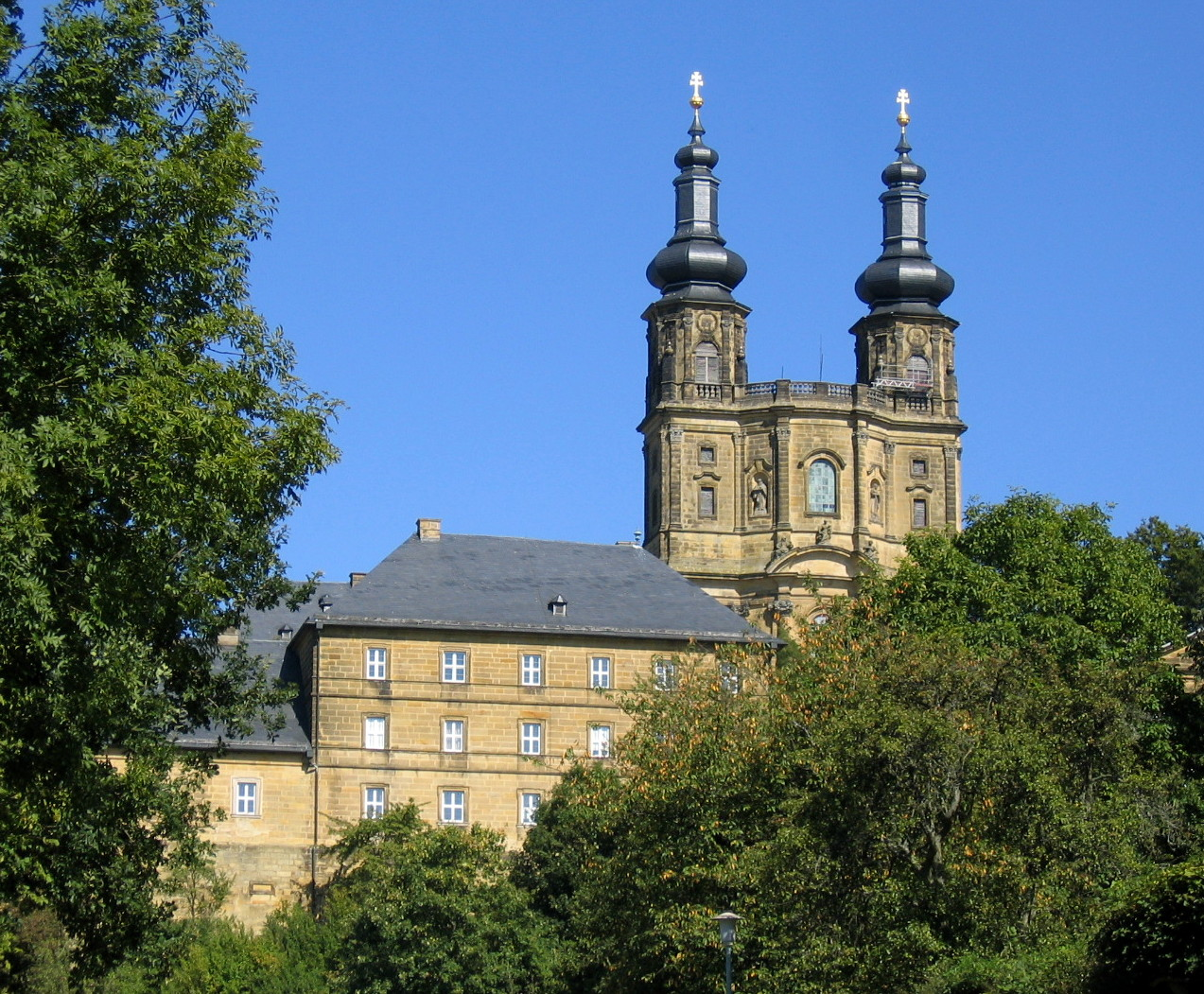
Banz Abbey by Leonhard and Johann Dientzenhofer

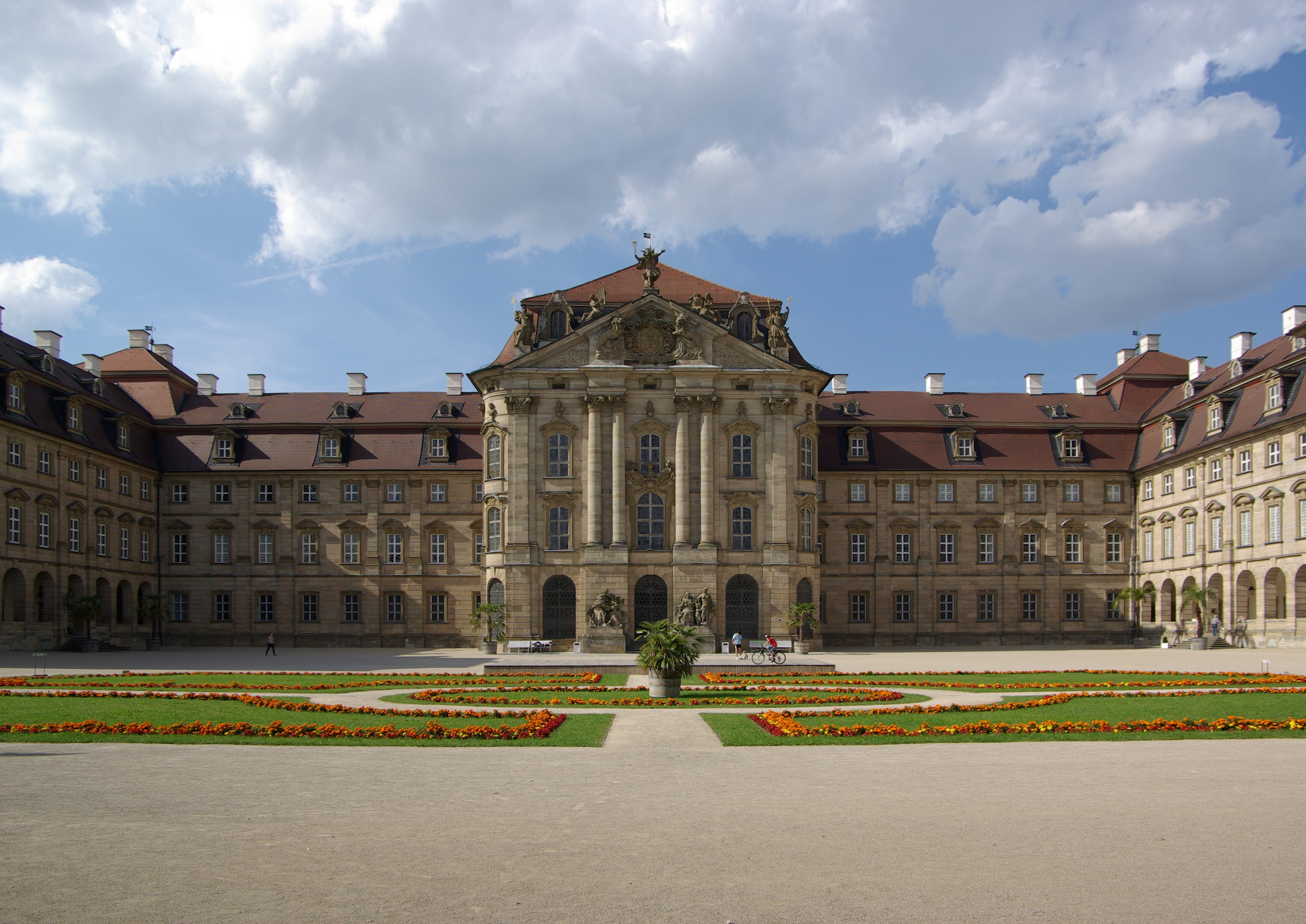
Schloss Weissenstein by Johann Dientzenhofer

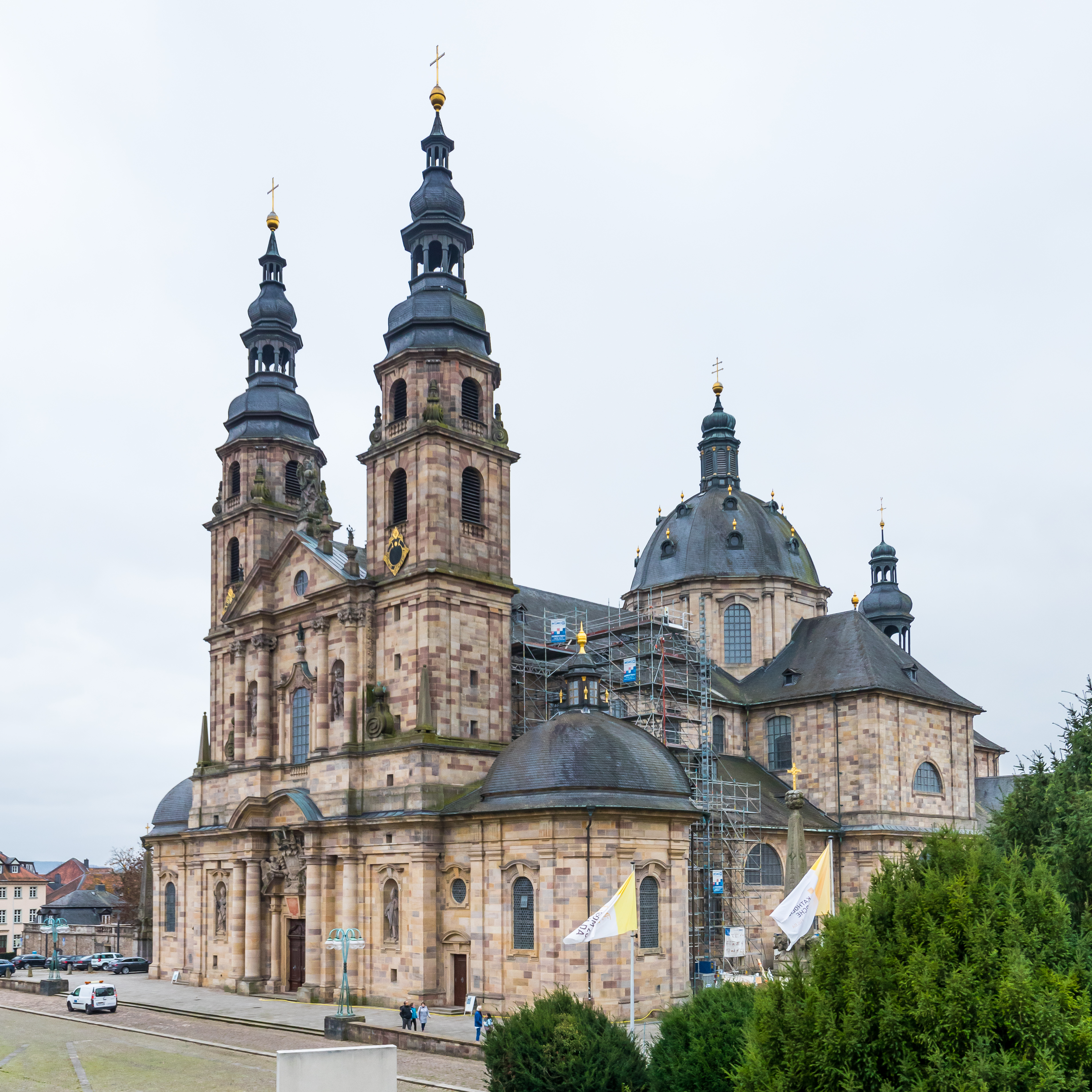
Cathedral of Fulda by Johann Dientzenhofer

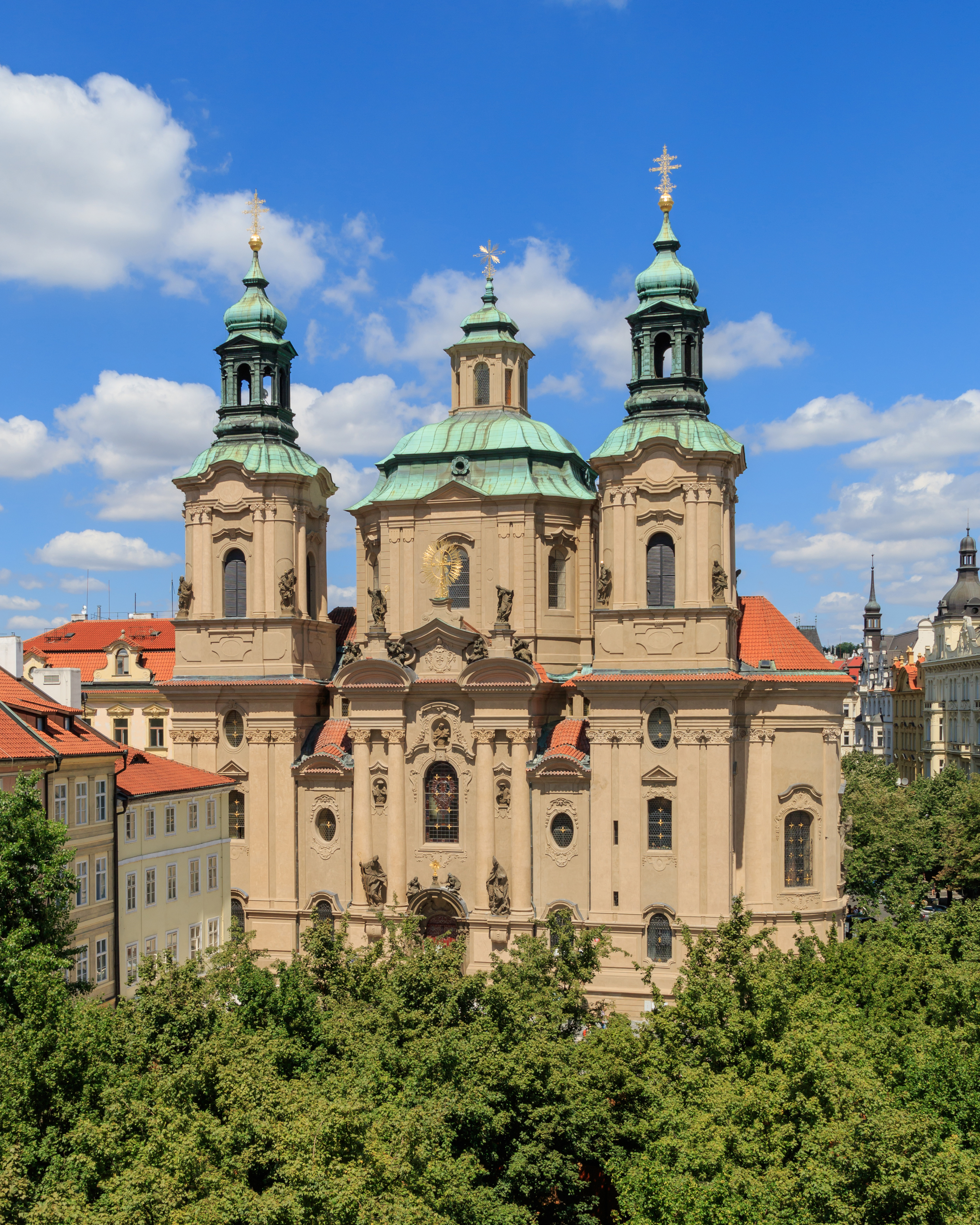
St Nicholas Church in Prague by Kilian Ignaz Dientzenhofer

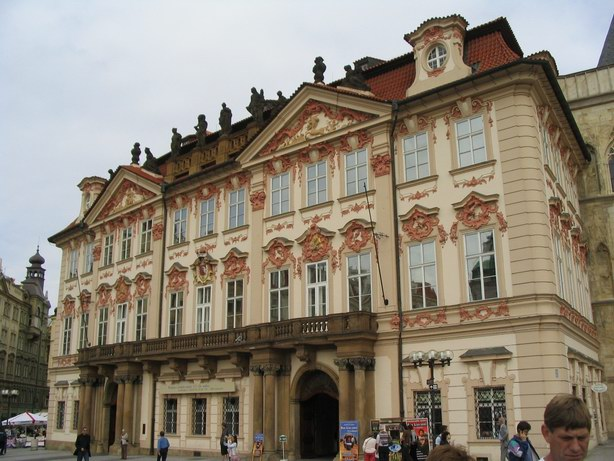
Kinský Palace in Prague by Kilian Ignaz Dientzenhofer

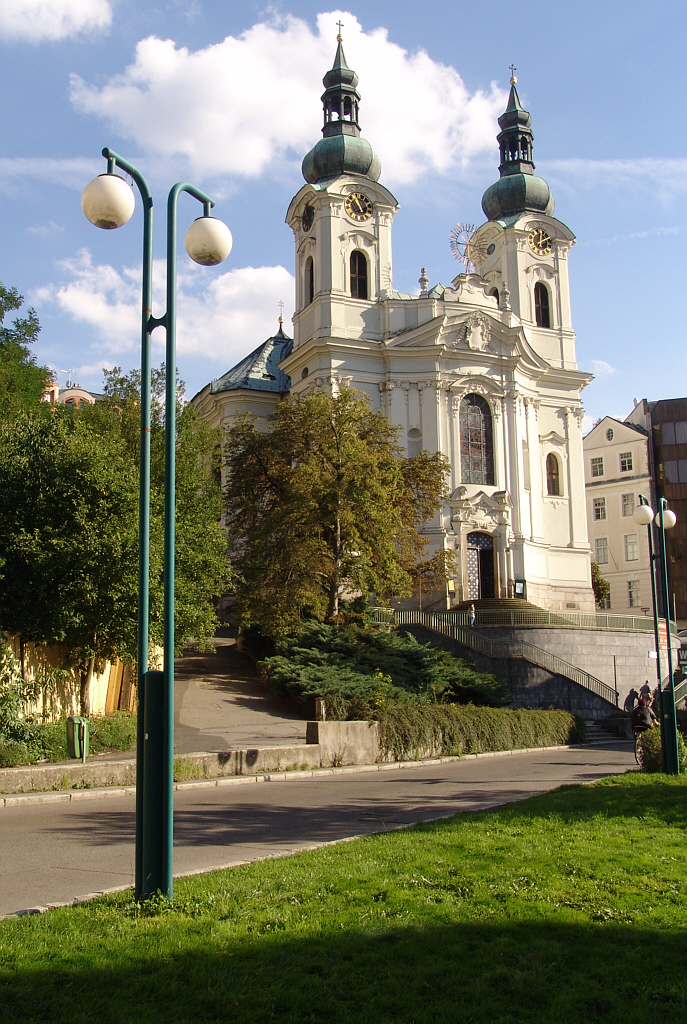
St. Mary Magdalene Church in Karlovy Vary by Kilian Ignaz Dientzenhofer

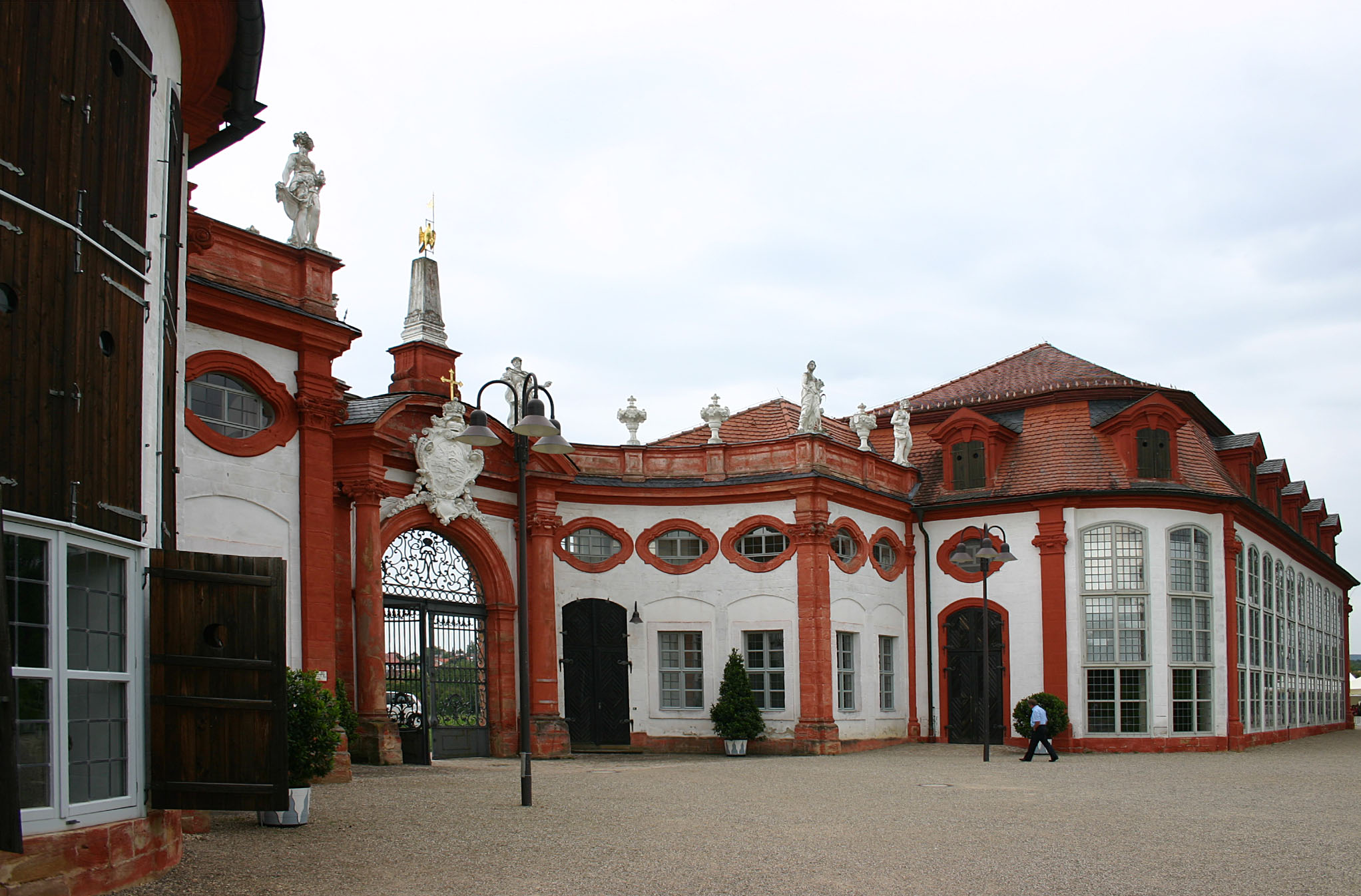
Seehof's Orangerie with Memmelsdorfer Gate in Bamberg by Justus Heinrich Dientzenhofer

== Literature ==
- Vilímková, Marie; Brucker, Johannes: Dientzenhofer. Eine bayerische Baumeisterfamilie in der Barockzeit. Rosenheimer Verlagshaus, 1989, ISBN 3-475-52610-7 (in German)
- Zimmer, Hans: Die Dientzenhofer. Ein bayerisches Baumeistergeschlecht in der Zeit des Barock. Rosenheim 1976, ISBN 3-475-52149-0 (in German)

== See also ==
- 5318 Dientzenhofer is one of the asteroids named after people
