= Christoph Dientzenhofer =

Bavarian architect

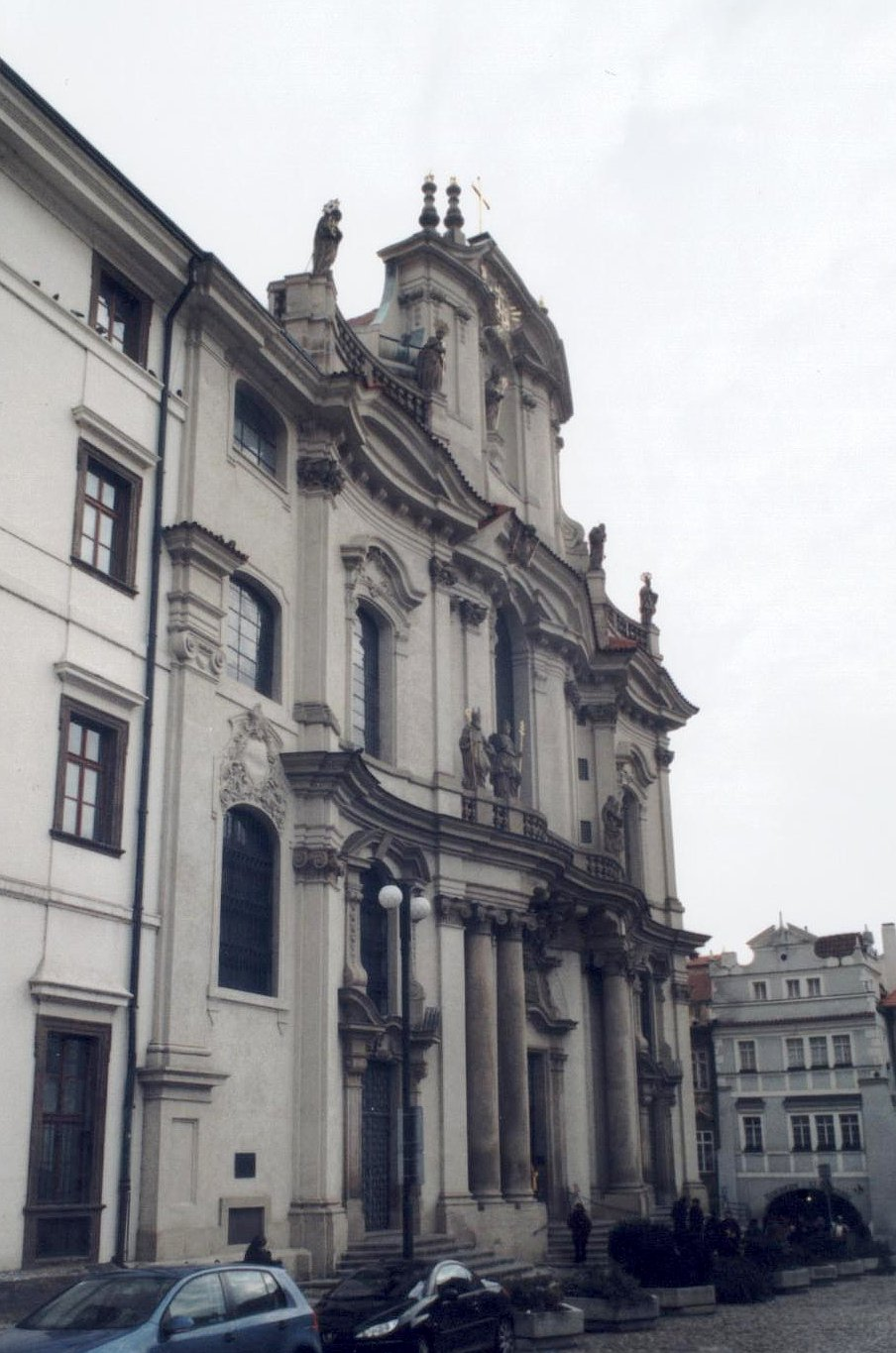
Church of St. Nicholas in Prague

Christoph Dientzenhofer (Czech: Kryštof Dientzenhofer; 7 July 1655 in St. Margarethen – 20 June 1722 in Prague) was a Bavarian architect of South-German, Austrian and Bohemian Baroque. He was a member of the famous Dientzenhofer family of architects, and the father of Kilian Ignaz Dientzenhofer.

Among his works are the Church of St. Nicholas (1703–1711, later completed by his son) and the Břevnov Monastery (1708–1721) in Prague, Church of St. Clare in Cheb (1708–1711). Some of his works are difficult to identify, due to the lack of documentation.

== See also ==
- Baroque architecture in Central Europe
- Czech Baroque architecture
