= Jan Santini Aichel =

Czech architect and nobleman (1677–1723)

Jan Blažej Santini Aichel
- Born: 3 February 1677; Prague, Kingdom of Bohemia
- Died: 7 December 1723 (aged 46); Prague, Kingdom of Bohemia
- Other names: Giovanni Battista Santini Aichel; Johann Blasius Santini Aichel
- Occupation: Architect
- Practice: Giovanni Battista Santini
- Buildings: Pilgrimage Church of Saint John of Nepomuk, Church of the Assumption of Our Lady and Saint John the Baptist

Jan Blažej Santini Aichel (Italian: Giovanni Battista Santini Aichel, German: Johann Blasius Santini Aichel; 3 February 1677 – 7 December 1723) was a Czech architect of Italian descent. His major works are representative of the unique Baroque Gothic style.

== Biography ==
Baptised as Johann Blasius Aichel, Jan Blažej Santini Aichel was born in Prague, Bohemia (now the Czech Republic) on 3 February 1677 (the day of Saint Blaise) to a Czech mother and Italian father as their oldest son. Both his grandfather Antonio Aichel (who moved to Prague from Italy in the 1630s) and his father Santini Aichel belonged to respectable stonemasons. Jan Blažej was born small, hunchbacked and partially lame, preventing him from following in his father's footsteps.

Around 1696 he started to travel and gain experience. After his journey through Austria he arrived in Rome, where he had the possibility to meet with the work of Francesco Borromini. When Aichel was in Italy, he incorporated his father's given name, Santini, into his name.

Aichel founded his architectural practice in Prague in 1703, attaining the status of a burgher of Prague in 1705. He bought and rebuilt the Valkounský House in the same year.

Aichel studied painting under the court painter Christian Schröder. He married Schröder's daughter, Veronika Alžběta, in 1707. They had four children, but all three sons died from tuberculosis at an early age; the only child left was Anna Veronika (born 1713). Aichel's wife died seven years later and he remarried a South Bohemian noblewoman, Antonia Ignatia Chrapická of Mohliškovice, whereby Aichel was ennobled. Daughter Jana Ludmila and son Jan Ignác Rochus were born from this marriage.

Aichel died at 46, having built over 100 buildings in his twenty-year career, but leaving some unfinished. Although he had become a well-regarded architect to Bohemia's greatest noble families and monastic orders, his original, eclectic style had few successors or imitators.

== Honours ==
The asteroid 37699 Santini-Aichl is named in his honour.

== Works ==
- Monastery Church of the Assumption of Our Lady and Saint John the Baptist in Kutná Hora-Sedlec (reconstruction, 1703–1708, World Heritage Site)
- Chapel of Saint Anne in Panenské Břežany (1705–1707)
- Pilgrimage Church of the Annunciation of the Virgin Mary and Cistercian Provost Office in Mariánská Týnice (1707–1710)
- Convent of the Cistercian Monastery in Plasy (reconstruction, 1711–1723)
- Monastery Church of the Assumption of Virgin Mary, St. Wolfgang and St. Benedict in Kladruby (1711)
- Monastery Church of the Nativity of Virgin Mary in Želiv (reconstruction, 1714–1720)
- Pilgrimage Church of the Name of Virgin Mary in Křtiny (1718)
- Pilgrimage Church of Saint John of Nepomuk on Zelená hora in Žďár nad Sázavou (1719–1727, World Heritage Site)
- Karlova Koruna Chateau in Chlumec nad Cidlinou (1721–1723)
- Church of Saint Wenceslaus in Zvole (reconstruction)
- Church of Saints Peter and Paul in Horní Bobrová (1714)
- Church of the Visitation of Virgin Mary in Obyčtov
- Church of the Assumption of Virgin Mary in Netín
- Provost Church of Saints Peter and Paul in Rajhrad (1721)
- Initial architect for the rebuilding of Zbraslav chateau
- Design and constructions of the Kalec chateau
- Reconstruction of Valkounský House (No.211-III) in Prague-Malá Strana (after 1705)

=== Gallery ===
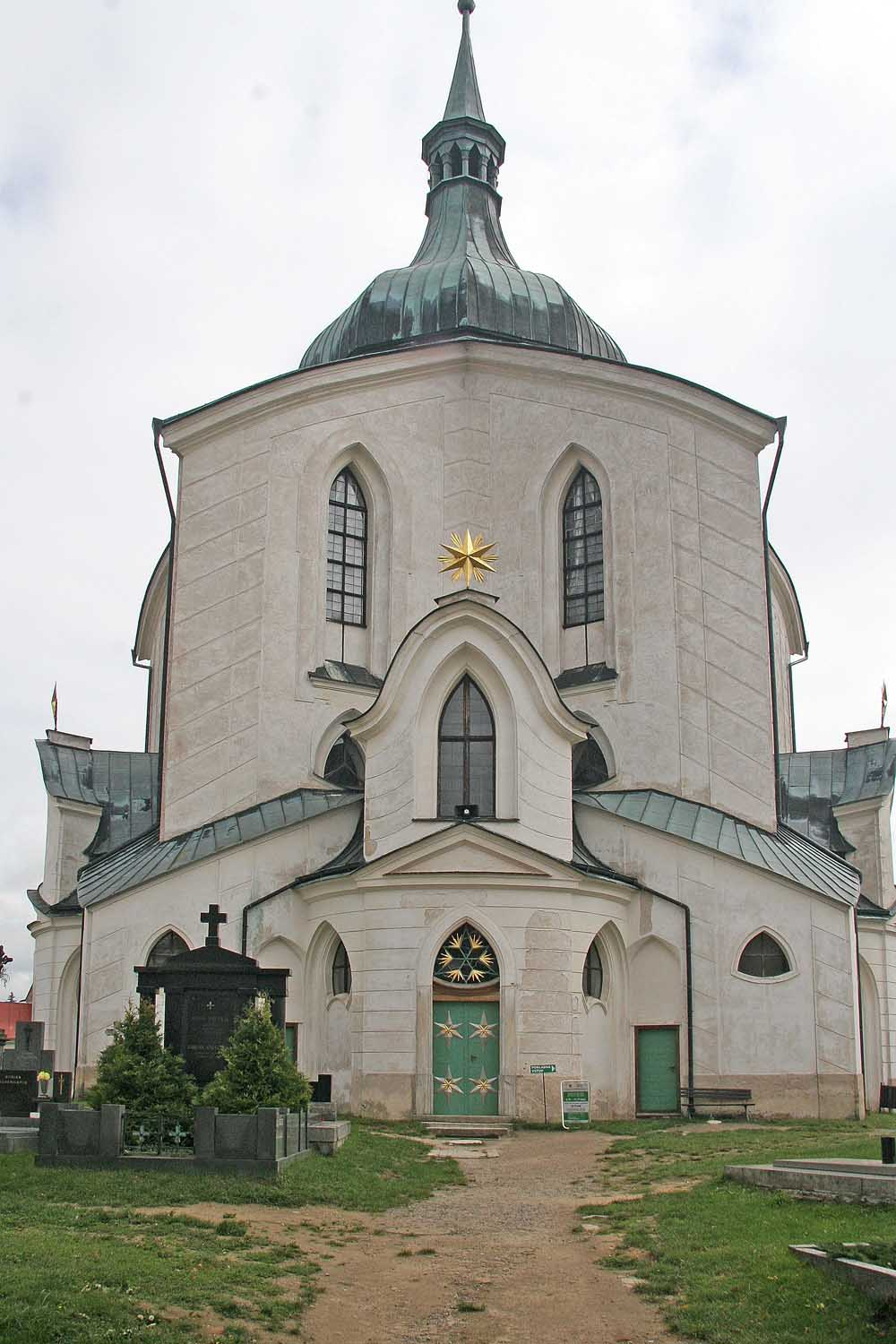
Pilgrimage Church of Saint John of Nepomuk on Zelená hora, a World Heritage Site

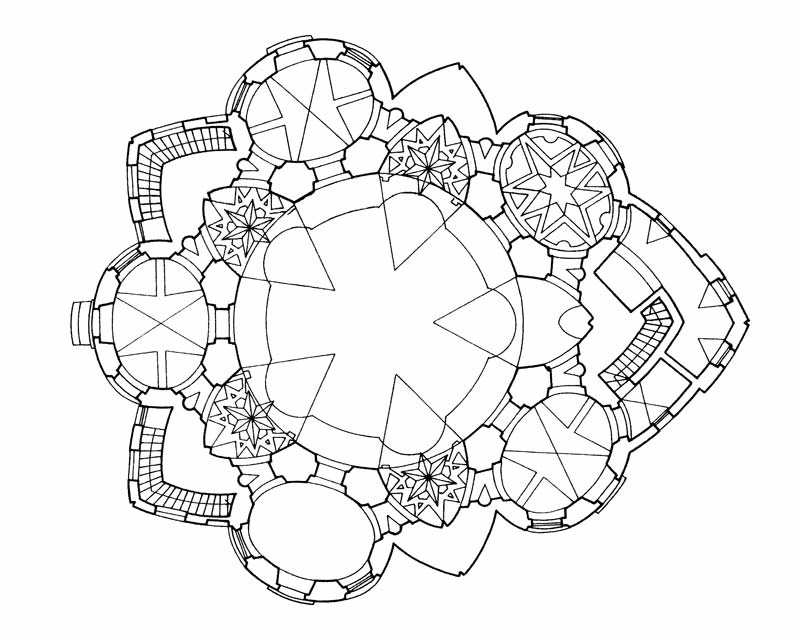
Ground plan of the church on Zelená hora

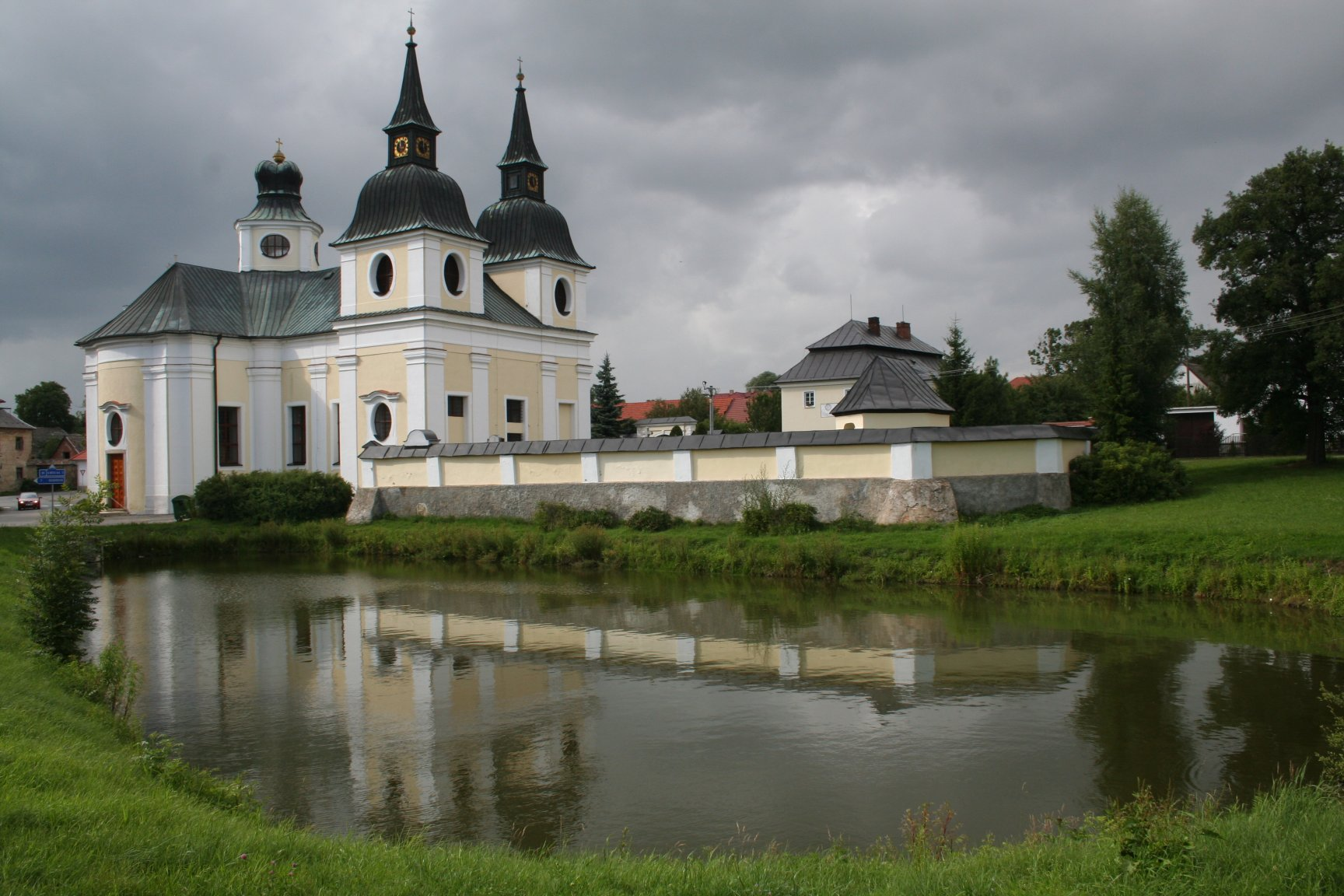
Church of St. Wenceslaus in Zvole

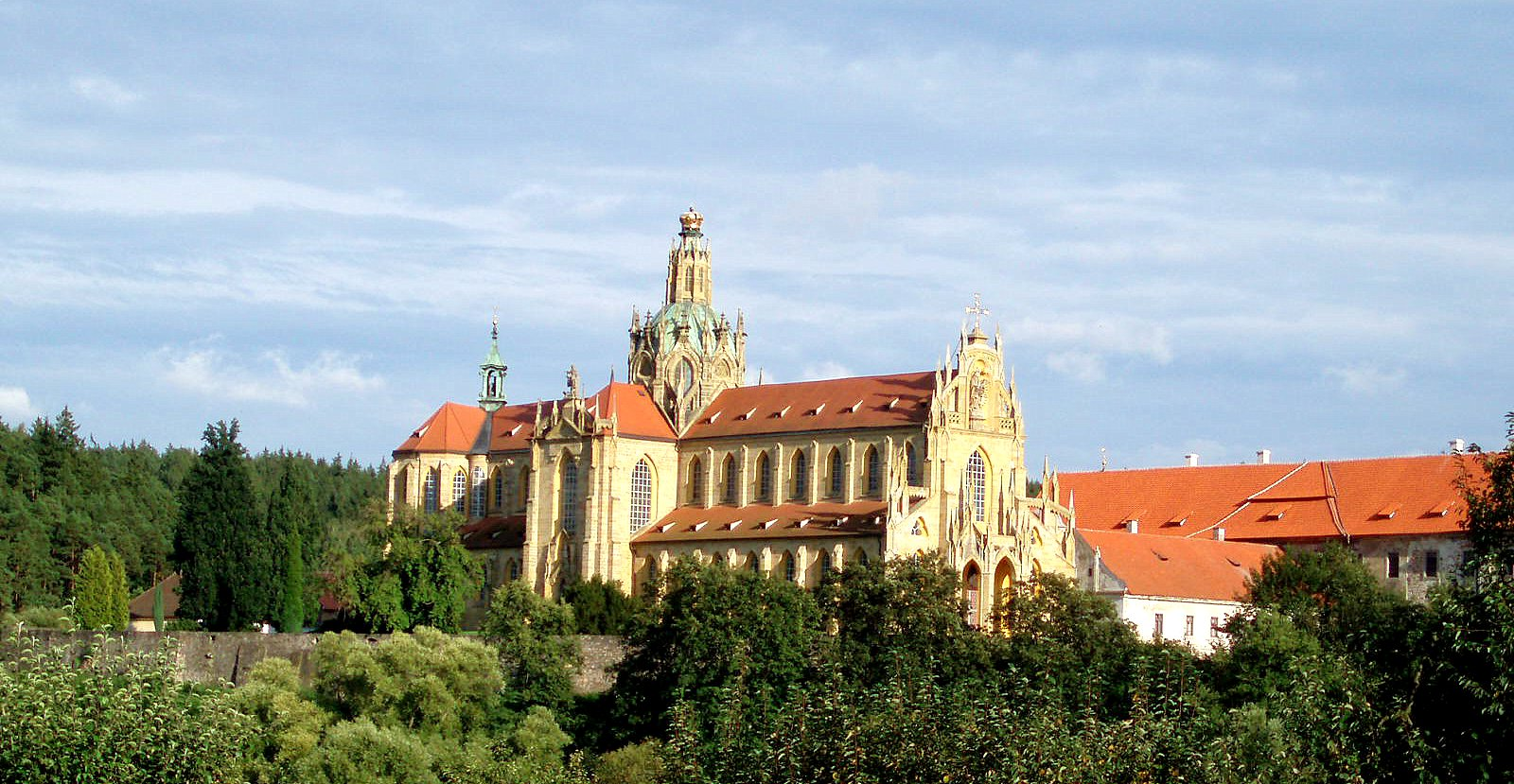
Monastery Church of the Assumption of Virgin Mary, St. Wolfgang and St. Benedict in Kladruby

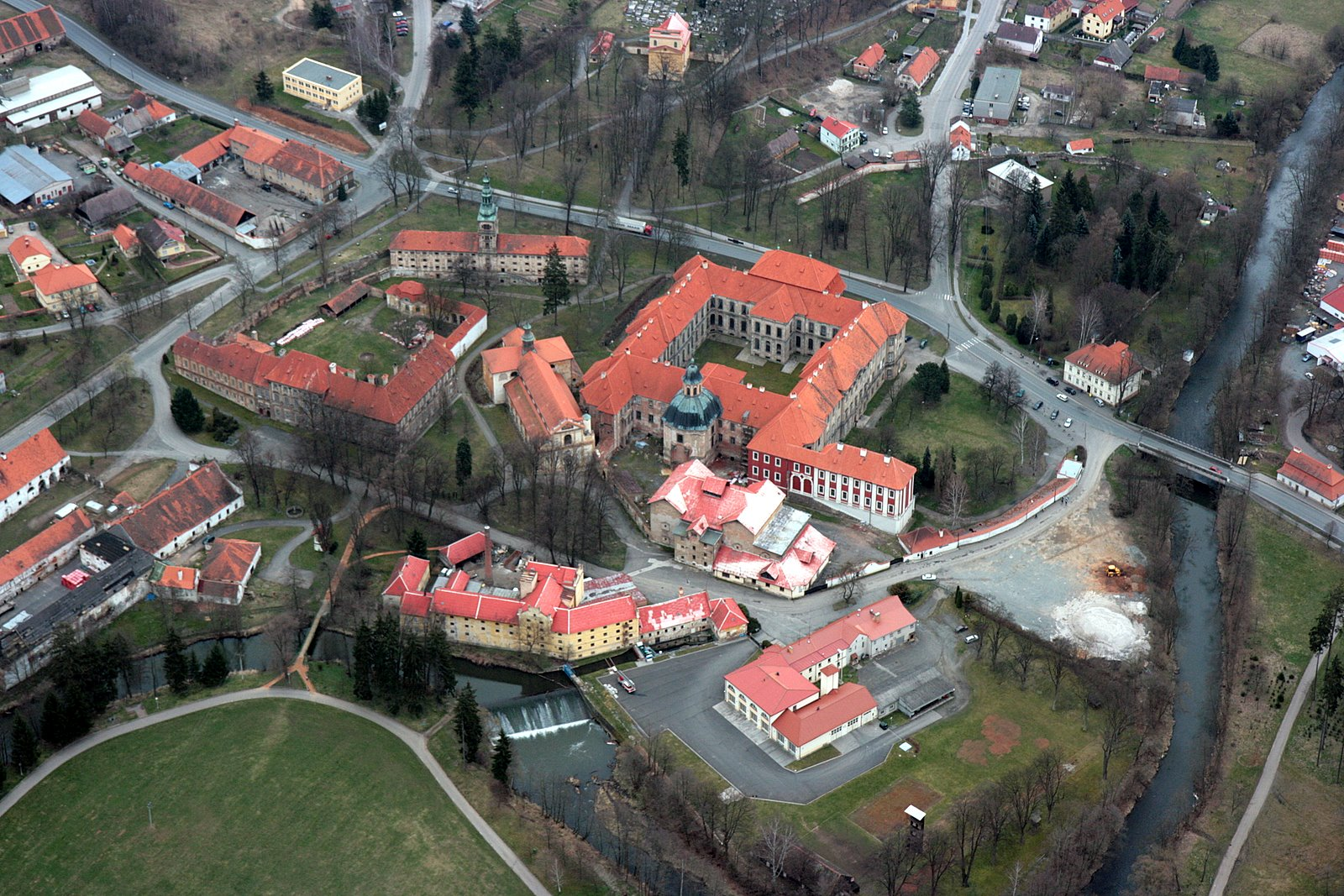
Convent of the Cistercian Monastery in Plasy complex

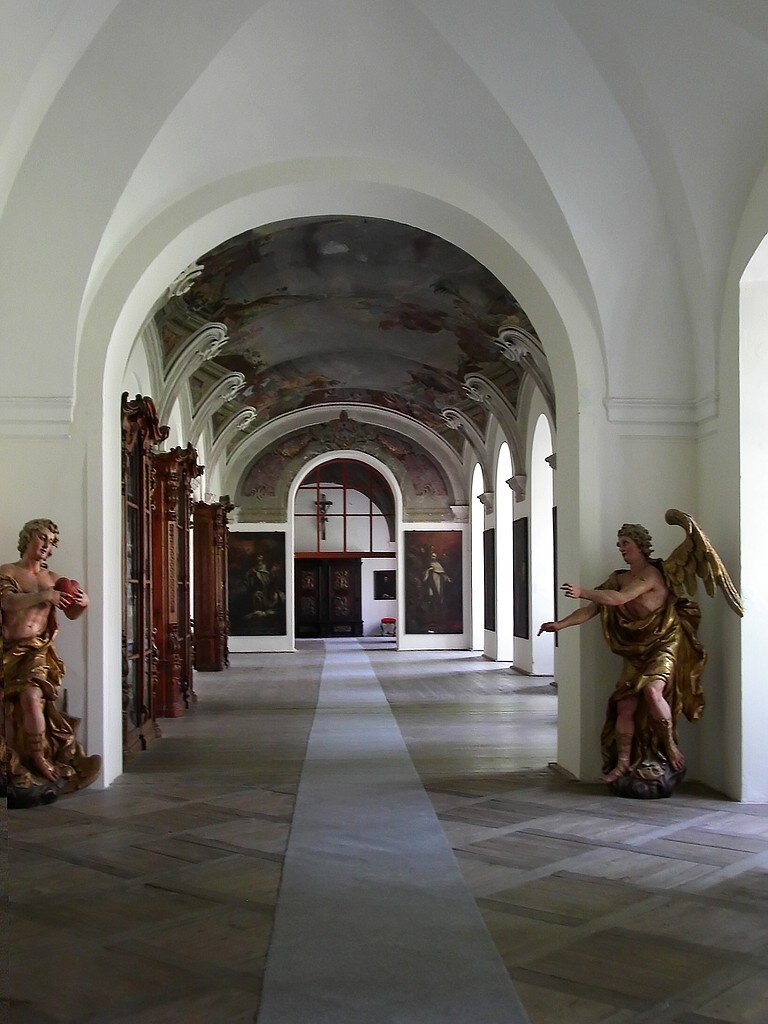
Interior of the Convent of the Cistercian Monastery in Plasy

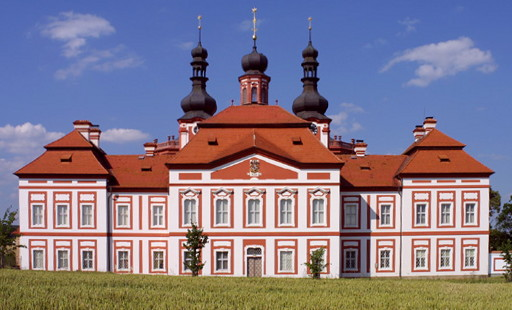
Pilgrimage Church of the Annunciation of the Virgin Mary and Cistercian Provost Office in Mariánská Týnice

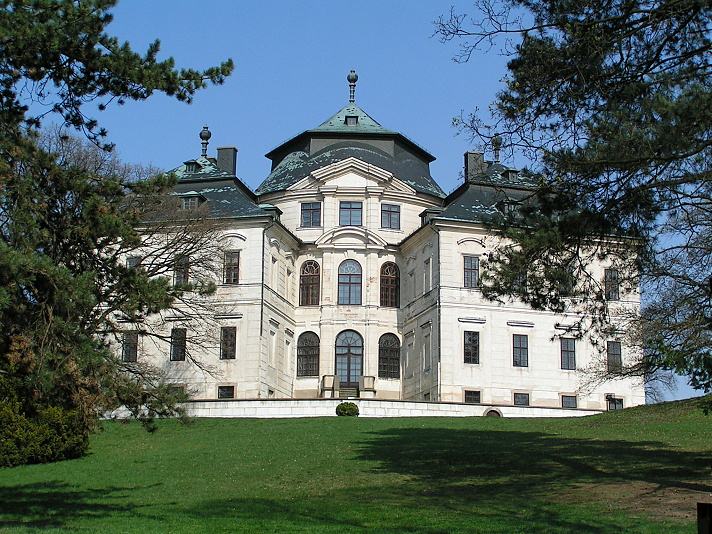
Karlova Koruna Chateau in Chlumec nad Cidlinou

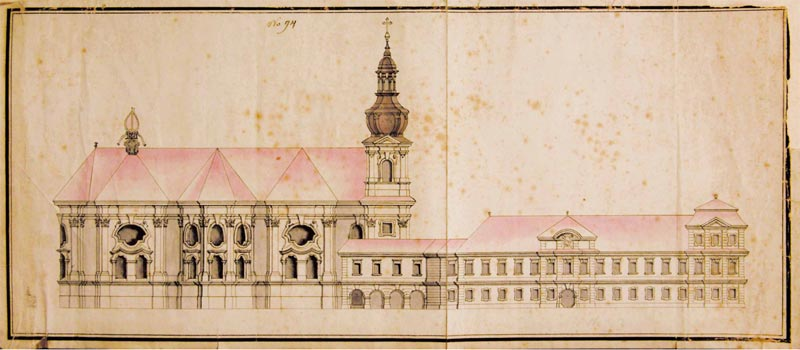
Original 18th century drawing of Provost Church of Saints Peter and Paul in Rajhrad by Santini

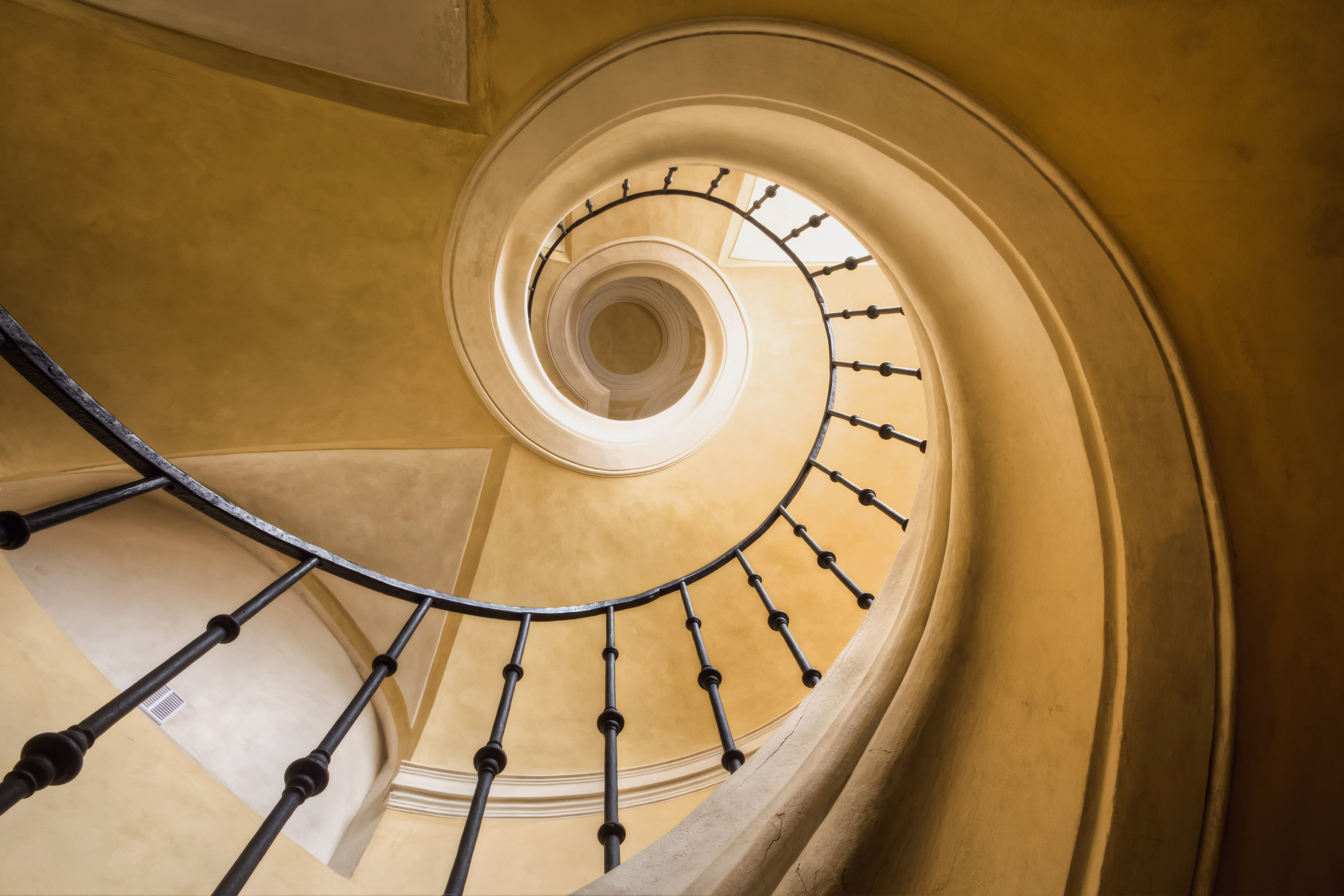
Stairs of the Church of the Assumption of Our Lady and Saint John the Baptist, Sedlec
