= Valkounský House =

- Valkounský dům
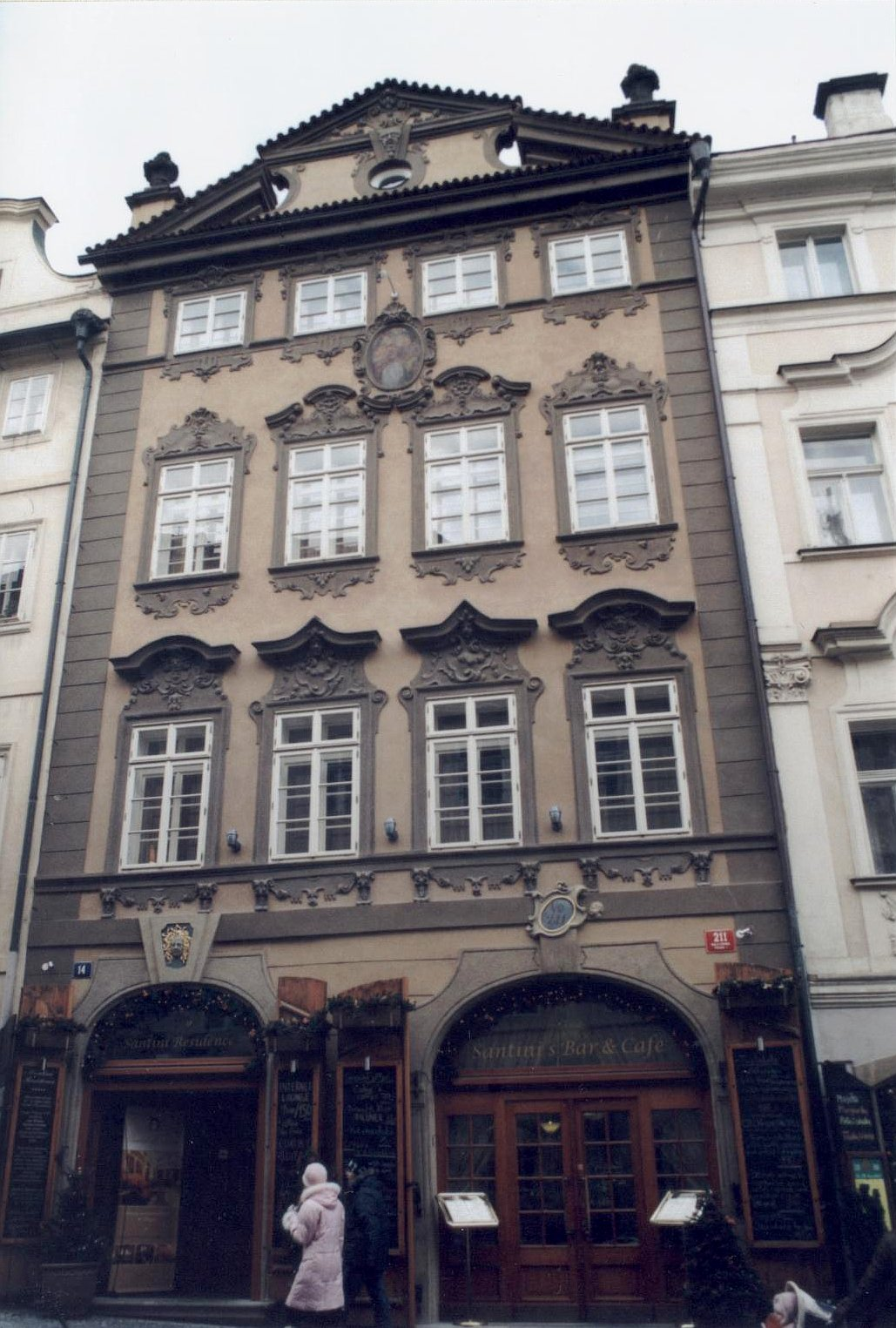
- Interactive map of the Valkounský House area

General information
- Location: Prague 1, Nerudova 211/14, 118 00, Czech Republic
- Coordinates: 50°5′19″N 14°24′3.72″E
- Completed: 1727

Valkounský House (Czech: Valkounský dům) is a house in northwestern Prague, Czech Republic. It is located at 211 Nerudova street, to the southeast of Prague Castle. It is named after the original owner, Knight Bohuchval Valkoun of Adlar, who owned it from the beginning of the 17th century. It is now run as a hotel.

== History ==
According to an early Baroque project of Christoph Dientzenhofer, the house was rebuilt in the 16th century, as all the neighbouring houses were after the fire of 1541. In 1601 it was bought by Kašpar Kaplíř of Sulevice, who was executed on the Old Town Square.

The house acquired its Baroque shape during 1705–1727, when it was owned by baroque architect, Jan Santini Aichel. Upon Santini's death, a renowned goldsmith bought the house and built up the third floor.

This town house served its tenants until 2002, when it was closed. At the same time, a careful reconstruction of the whole property commenced, and the authentic wooden ceilings, ribbed vaults, wall fresco paintings and an original porcelain cocklestove have been retained in what is now a hotel. Of note are exquisite details such as a Medusa relief over the left entrance, a cartouche and a small head next to it beyond the right entrance, an oval cartouche with a painting of Virgin Mary and the Holy Trinity above the second floor windows or the functional sun dial placed on the façade in the inner block.
