= Pilgrimage Church of Saint John of Nepomuk =

Pilgrimage Church of St John of Nepomuk at Zelená hora
UNESCO World Heritage Site
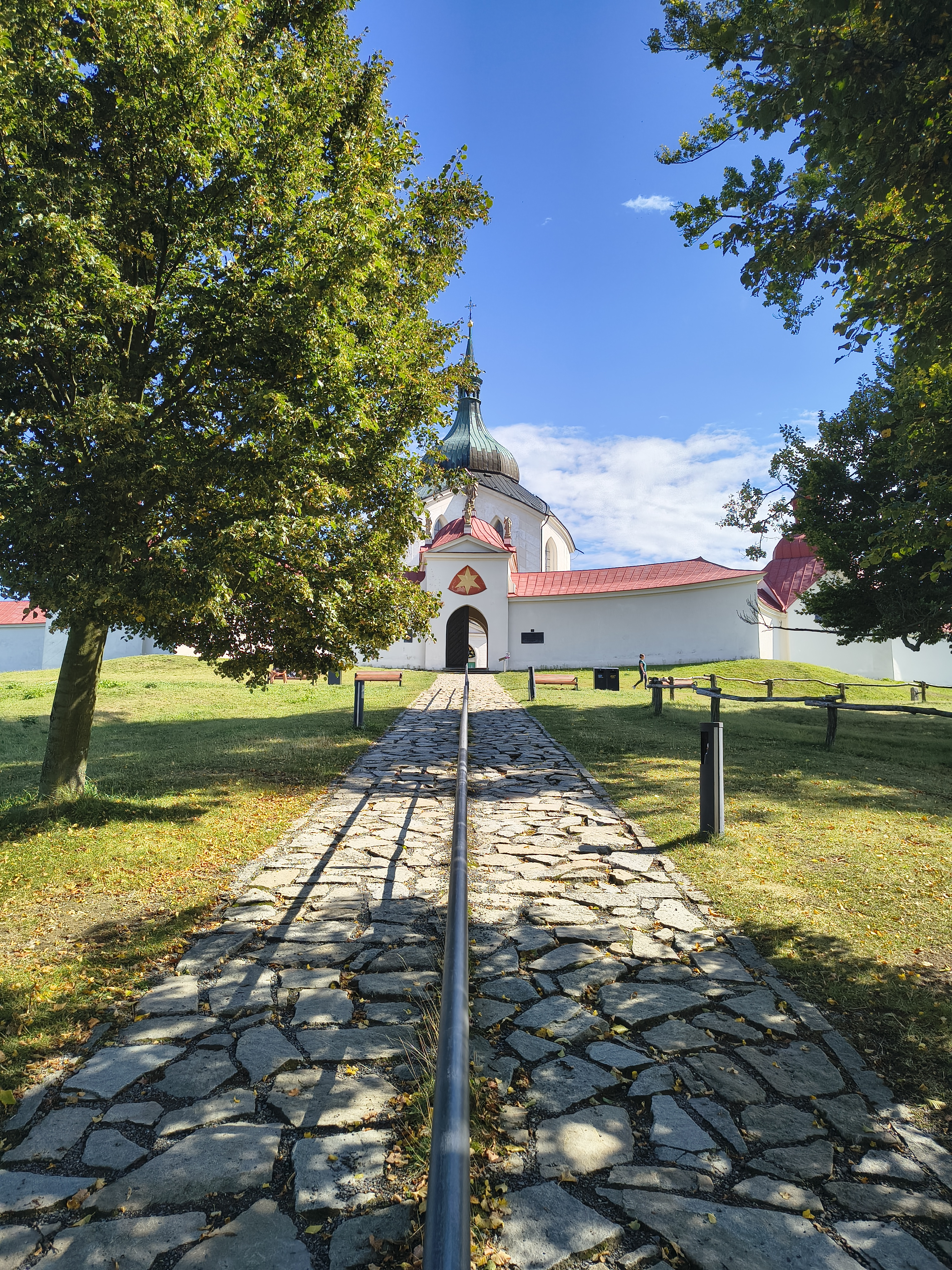

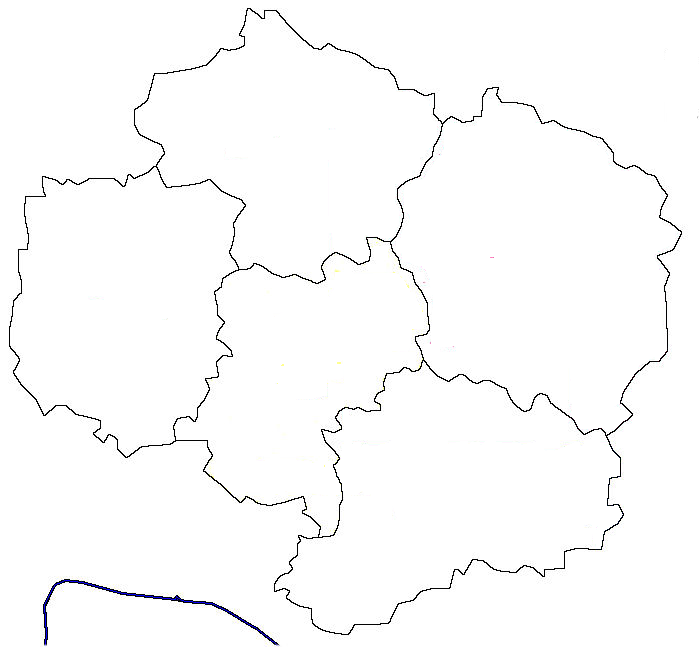
- Location within Vysočina Region Location within Czech Republic
- Location: Žďár nad Sázavou, Vysočina Region, Czech Republic
- Criteria: Cultural: (iv)
- Reference: 690
- Inscription: 1994 (18th Session)
- Area: 0.64 ha (1.6 acres)
- Buffer zone: 627.9 ha (1,552 acres)
- Website: www.zelena-hora.eu/en
- Coordinates: 49°34′48.7″N 15°56′31.4″E

The Pilgrimage Church of Saint John of Nepomuk (Czech: Poutní kostel svatého Jana Nepomuckého) at Zelená hora (meaning "Green Hill", German: Grünberg) is a religious building at the edge of Žďár nad Sázavou, Czech Republic, near the historical border between Moravia and Bohemia. It is the final work of Johann Santini Aichel, a Bohemian architect who combined the Borrominiesque Baroque with references to Gothic elements in both construction and decoration.

In 1719, when the Roman Catholic Church declared the tongue of John of Nepomuk to be incorruptible, work started to build a church at Zelená hora, where the future saint had received his early education. It was consecrated immediately after John's beatification in 1720, although construction works lumbered on until 1727. Half a century later, after a serious fire, the shape of the roof was altered.

The church, with many furnishings designed by Santini himself, is remarkable for its gothicizing features and complex symbolism, quite unusual for the time. In 1994, it was declared a World Heritage Site. The nomination dossier pointed out Santini's mathematical ratios in its architecture which aimed at "the creation of an independent spatial reality", with "the number 5 being dominant in the layout and proportions" of the church.

== History ==
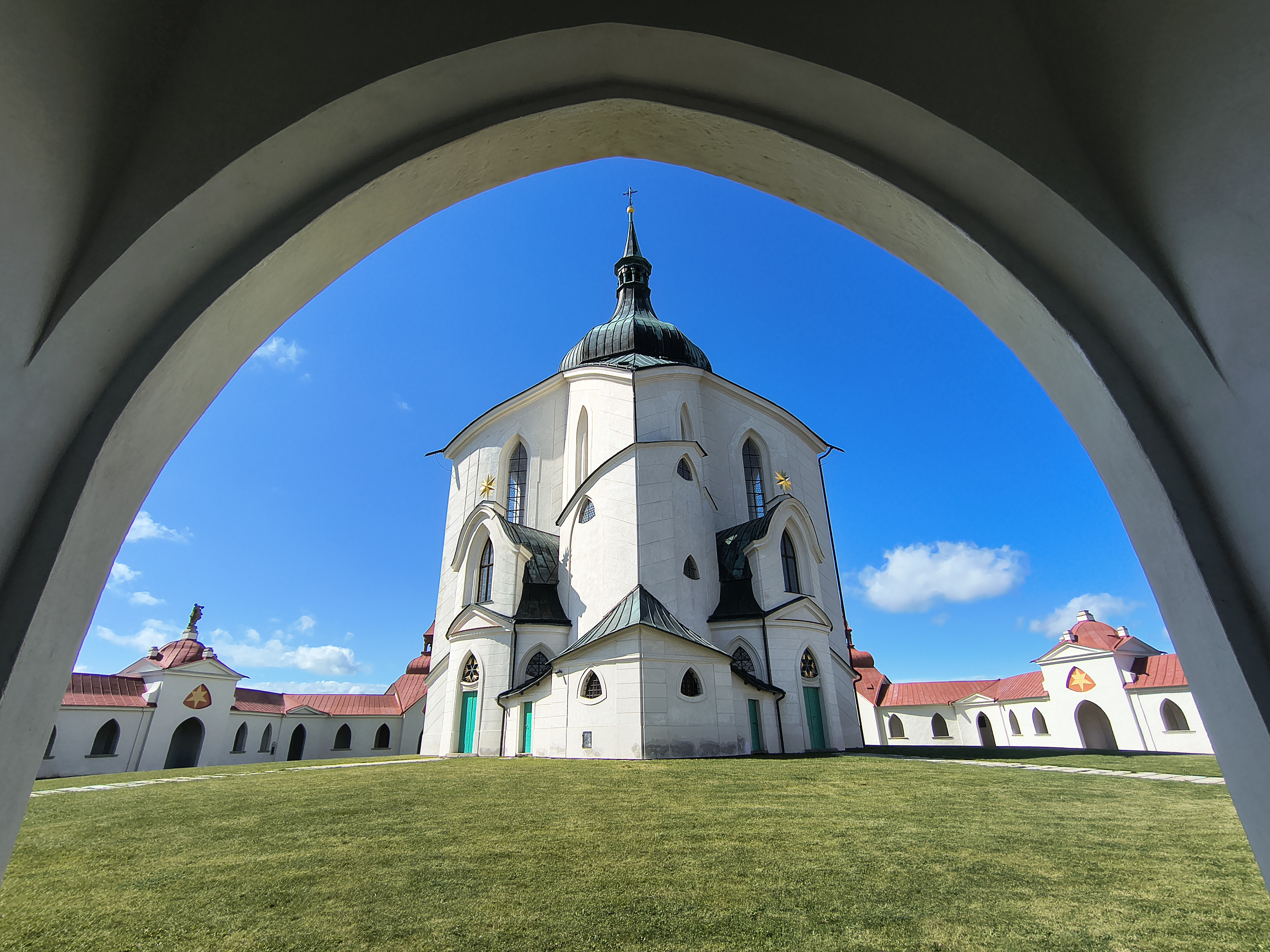
Dome

=== Planning and construction ===
The pilgrimage Church of St. John of Nepomuk near the monastery in Žďár(currently Zdar Estate with New generation museum) was built through the collaboration of Václav Vejmluva, an abbot of the Cistercian monastery in Žďár, and the famous architect Johann Santini Aichel. Vejmluva was a proven devotee of John of Nepomuk before he was beatified as well as after he was canonized. The preparation of the project dates from late April to the early August 1719, and is considered a direct reaction of the abbot to the discovery of preserved tissue in the tomb of John of Nepomuk in the St. Vitus Cathedral on 15 April 1719. The design of the building was entrusted to Santini Aichel to whom abbot Vejmluva is alleged to have presented his ideas about the new sanctuary and the symbols used. However, Santini dealt with the project quite individually, departing from the traditional shapes of religious buildings. He melded the abbot's idea of the church dominated by the pattern of a star into an extraordinarily impressive form which received mixed contemporary reviews. Friedrich Radnitzký, a member of the Central Committee, referred to the church as a "visually mysterious phenomenon" as late as 1886. The project was finished unusually quickly (dedicated in 1722), possibly because of the strong cooperation between Vejmluva and Santini, and their shared expertise in symbology and the teaching of the Cabala. The definitive shape of the building does not differ much from the first design and only a few changes were made.

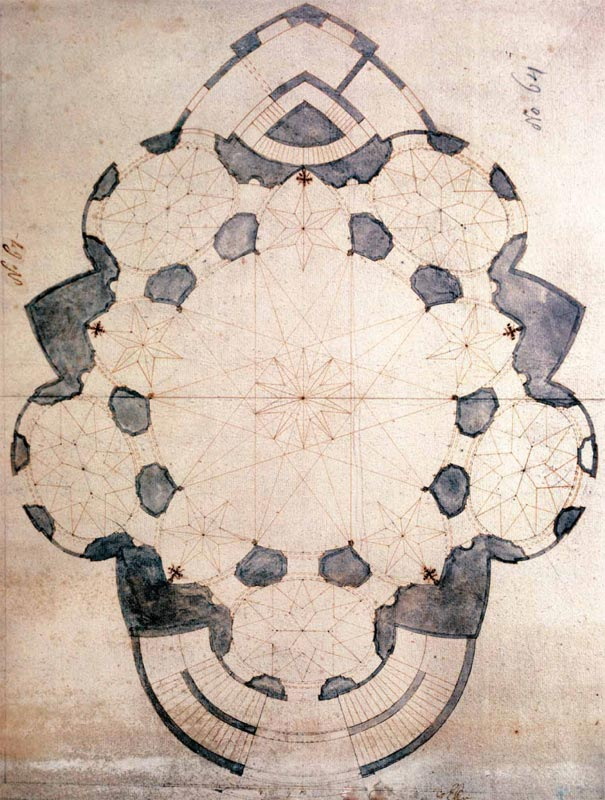
Original drawing from Santini – 18th century

=== Later history ===
On the 17 July 1784 the roof of the church and its ambulatory caught fire. Fortunately local citizens with great help of Matěj Sychra managed to save it from complete destruction. Permission to restore the church was given by the gubernium (administrative unit) in 1792 with the conditions that the church would no longer be a pilgrimage church, and that the cemetery of Žďár nad Sázavou would be moved to the church area. Nowadays, the cemetery is no longer in use and is in fact being slowly moved out, to give the place the original look as it had in baroque times. The church became a property of the state in 1953, but was returned to the Catholic Church in 2014.

== Description ==
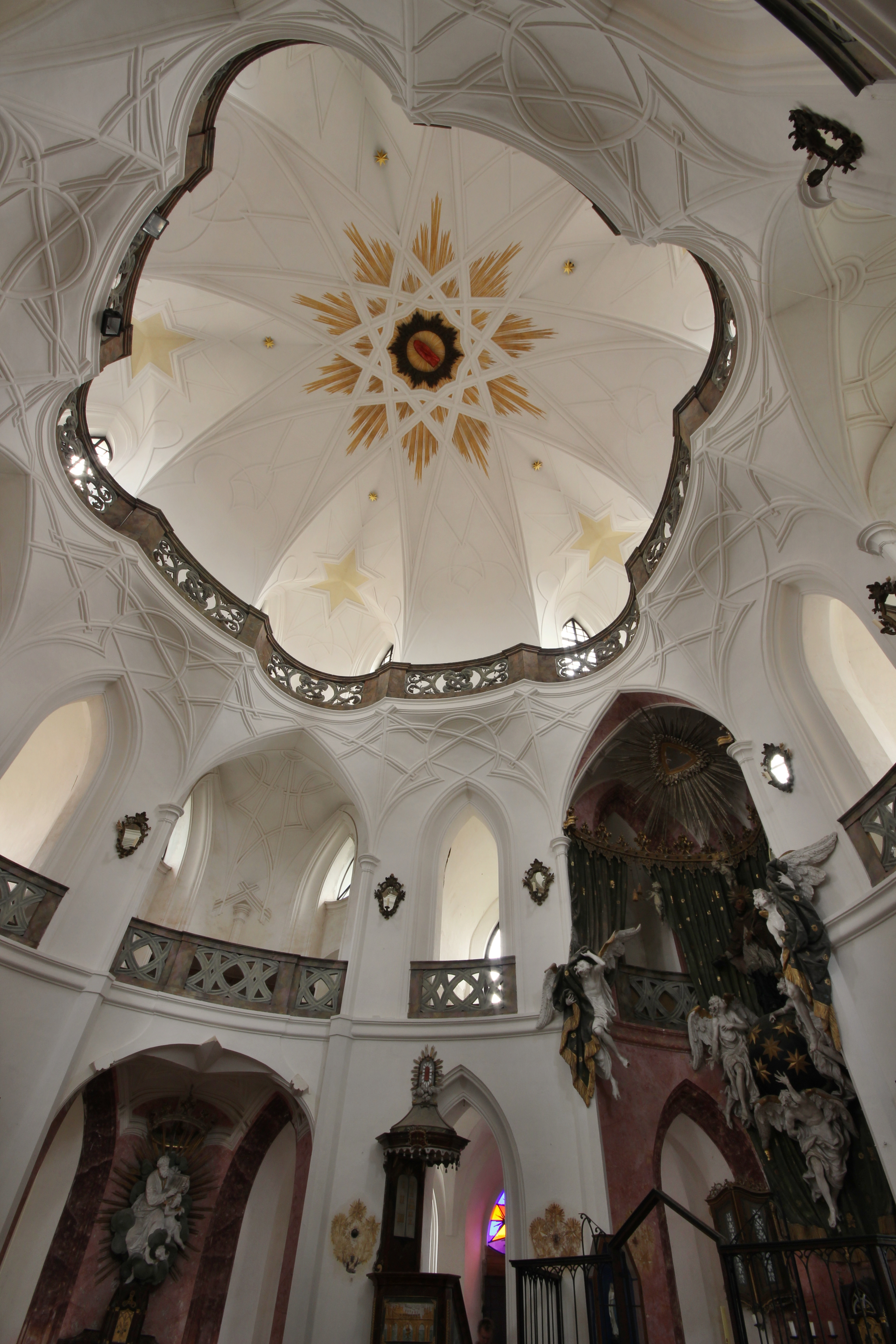
View of dome

=== Ground plan ===
The central church along with its adjacent cloister is uniformly projected and built structure. Architecture of this building is very minimalistic and enormously effective. It combines Baroque and Gothic elements which in fact points to the age when John of Nepomuk lived, worked and was martyred. The construction of church is based on geometry of circle while constantly repeating number five as a reference to Nepomuk's five stars. Those stars, according to a legend, appeared above his body when he had died.

This is a good example of how Santini used to project his structures—practically just by using compass to draft whole building on arcs of circles which radius was generally multiple of building's module. In case of church of Saint John Nepomuk, Santini used number 5, Nepomuk's stars, number 3 which references to the Trinity, and number 6 which references to Saint Mary because John of Nepomuk was perceived as her adorer. Therefore, on the perimeter of church take turns five chapels with triangular ground plan and five with oval ground plan. At the same time the whole church resembles cut through choir of a Gothic cathedral and its buttress. The centrality of Nepomuk's church builds up a vertical as a symbolical phenomenon. This very vertical tends to raise visitors look up to the symbolical heaven.

=== Central area ===
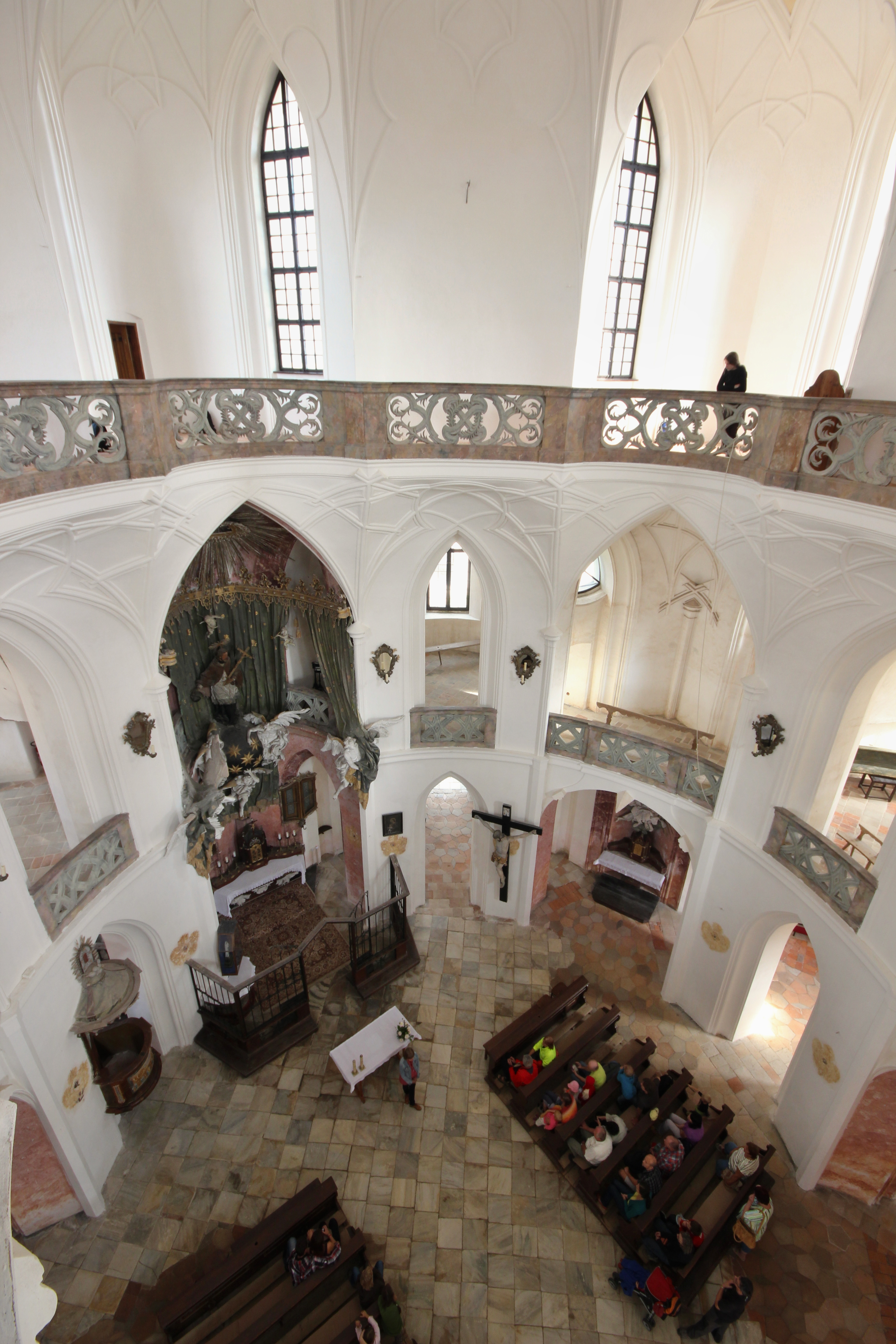
Central area and two floors

In inner area of the church there are oval perimeter chapels which are connected with central cylinder space by narrower ogive arches. The central area which is covered by vault with lunettes, is carried by ten pillars. In first floor there are tribunes corresponding to chapels in the basement. Second floor is decorated with the gallery counting ten pieces of art which are arranged round the heel of the vault. Stucco decoration is limited to motives of intersecting and cut rib arches similar to Gothic vaults. As on the other Santini's buildings, even here light is used to build inner space. This approach is based on baroque interpretation of light as a sign of god's presence. Some call this 'sacral light'. The illumination of church's interior creates unique paradox. Meanwhile, central area is illuminated only indirectly the side walkway parts of the church are awash with light. This light permeates into central area of the church by ogive arches placed in places where should stand the bearing pillars. The stucco decoration underlines this paradox by creating relation between wall and arch belonging to that particular wall. This makes a feeling that the wall is only a shell and the whole building is carried by light itself. The entire church is then perceived also as a reliquary in where the relic of tongue of Saint John of Nepomuk dwells.

=== Main altar ===
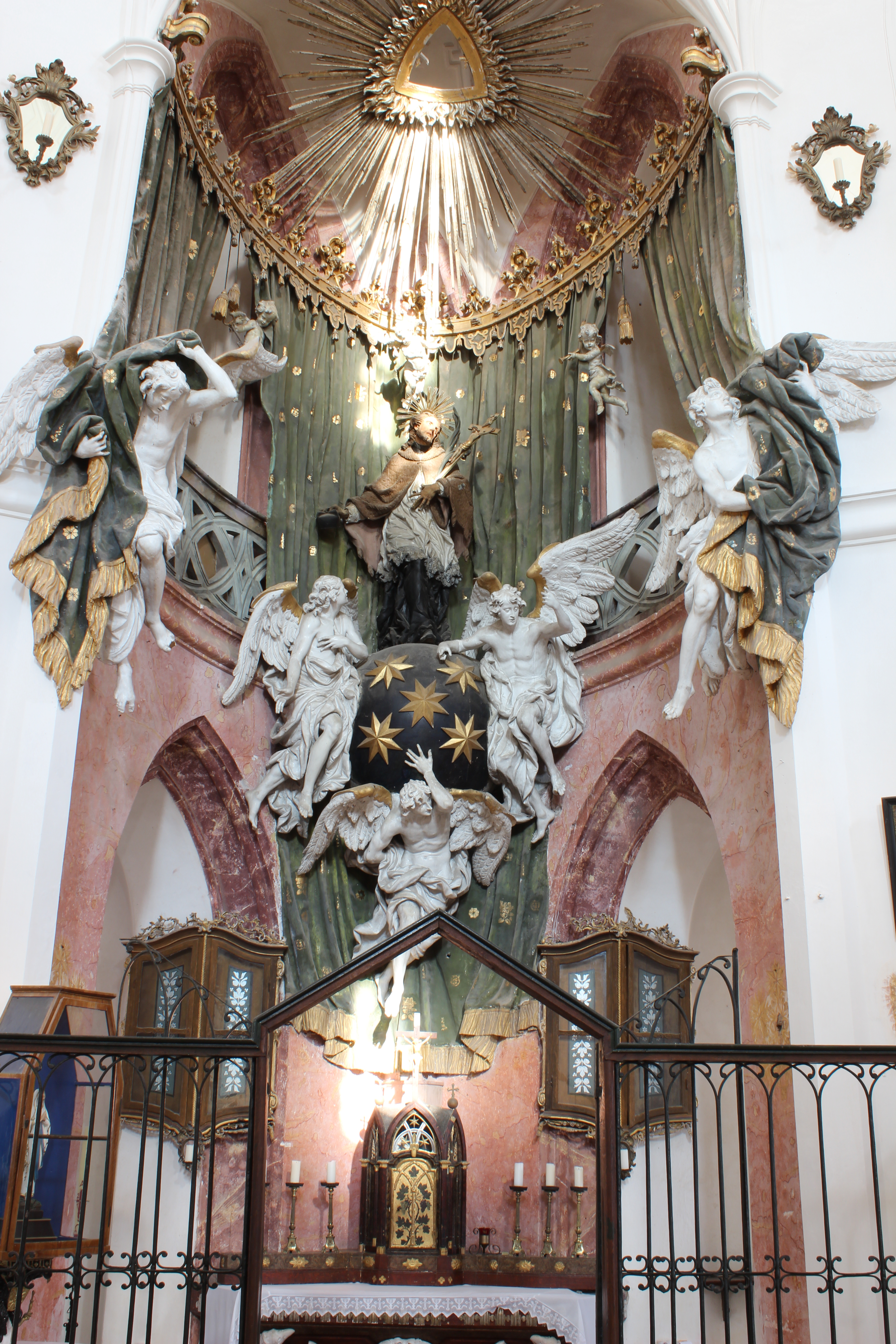
Main altar

The main altar on eastern side is placed into high arcade. The peak of the altar reaches to the railing on the gallery on the second floor. Carvings of five angels on the main altar (with its count five pointing to John of Nepomuk) and the Four Evangelists are made by hands of a sculptor coming from Chrudim named Jan Pavel Čechpauer in years 1725–27. Three of five angels are bearing a sphere standing for heaven sky decorated with five stars. On the sphere stands figure of St. John of Nepomuk. The sculpture is a work of Řehoř Theny. He made also the reliefs on the litter for the silver pilgrimage statue of St. John of Nepomuk from year 1729 made by prague goldsmith Jan Diesbach. This statue disappeared after year 1784. The choice of contacting sculptors close to Matthias Braun was on purpose because Santini collaborated on his realizations many times actually with Braun whose 'sculpture language' was apparently very close to Santini's personality.

=== Surrounding ===
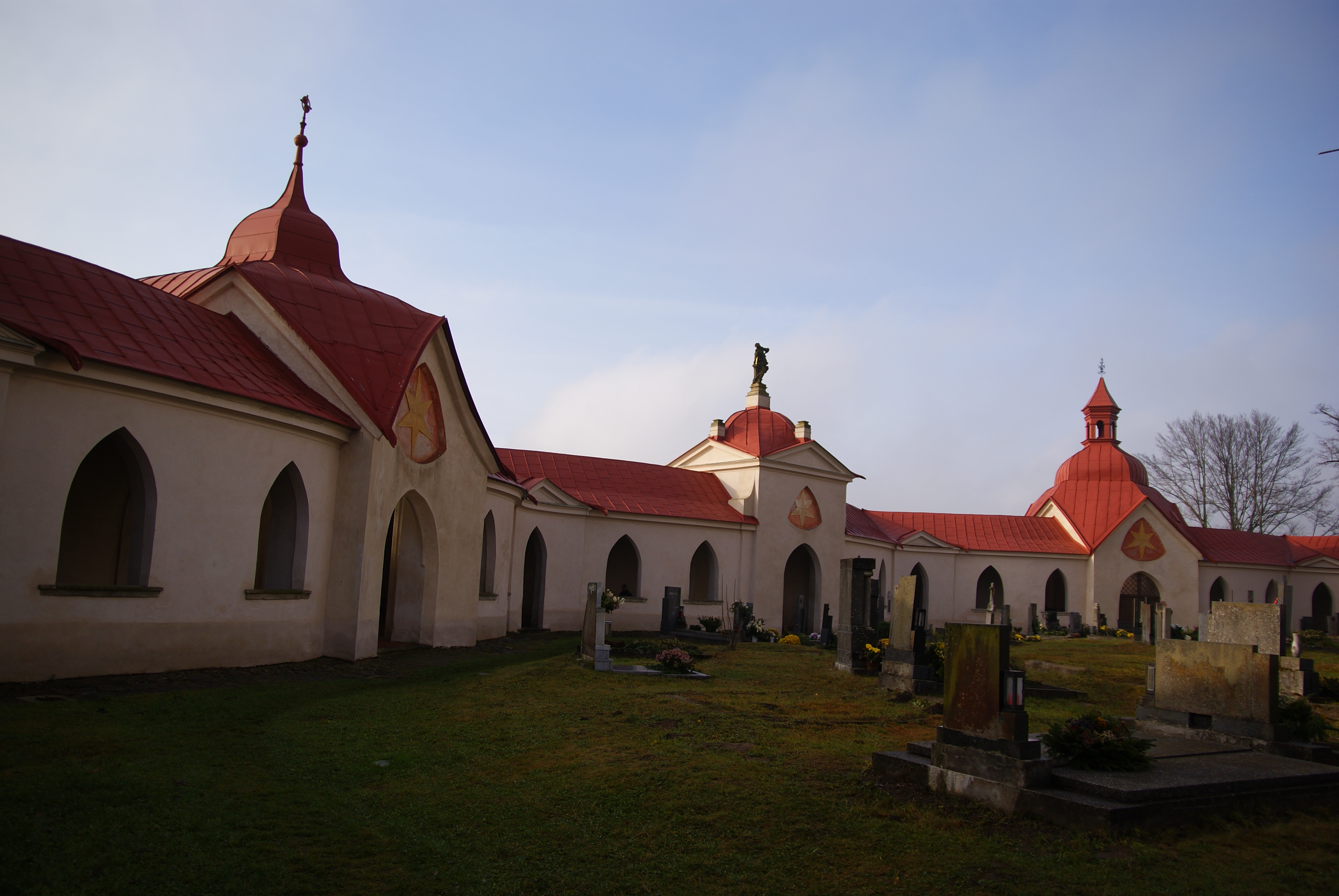
Cloister divided by gates and chapels

Around the church is built a ring cloister divided into ten sections by five chapels and five gates all this on a circular ground plan. Roof of each chapel originally culminated into five Pylons. These pointed to the meaning of light and symbolized eternity. The cloister along with chapels was a place where pilgrims prayed and also hid when the weather turned bad. Not only the church itself but also its surrounding – cloister with chapels – illustrates Santini's great architectonic and creative potency.

== See also ==
- 18th-century Western domes

== Gallery ==
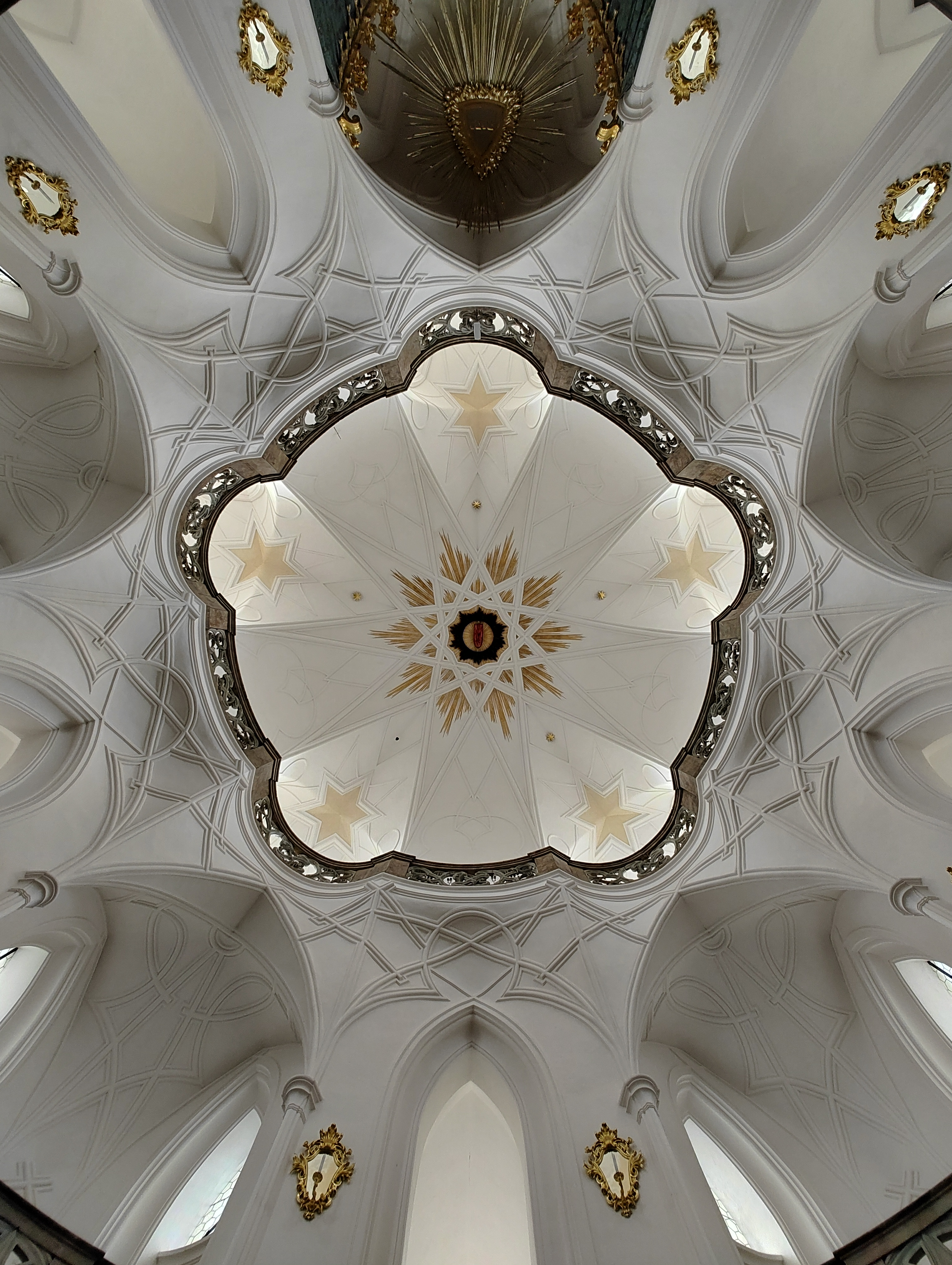
Ceiling of church

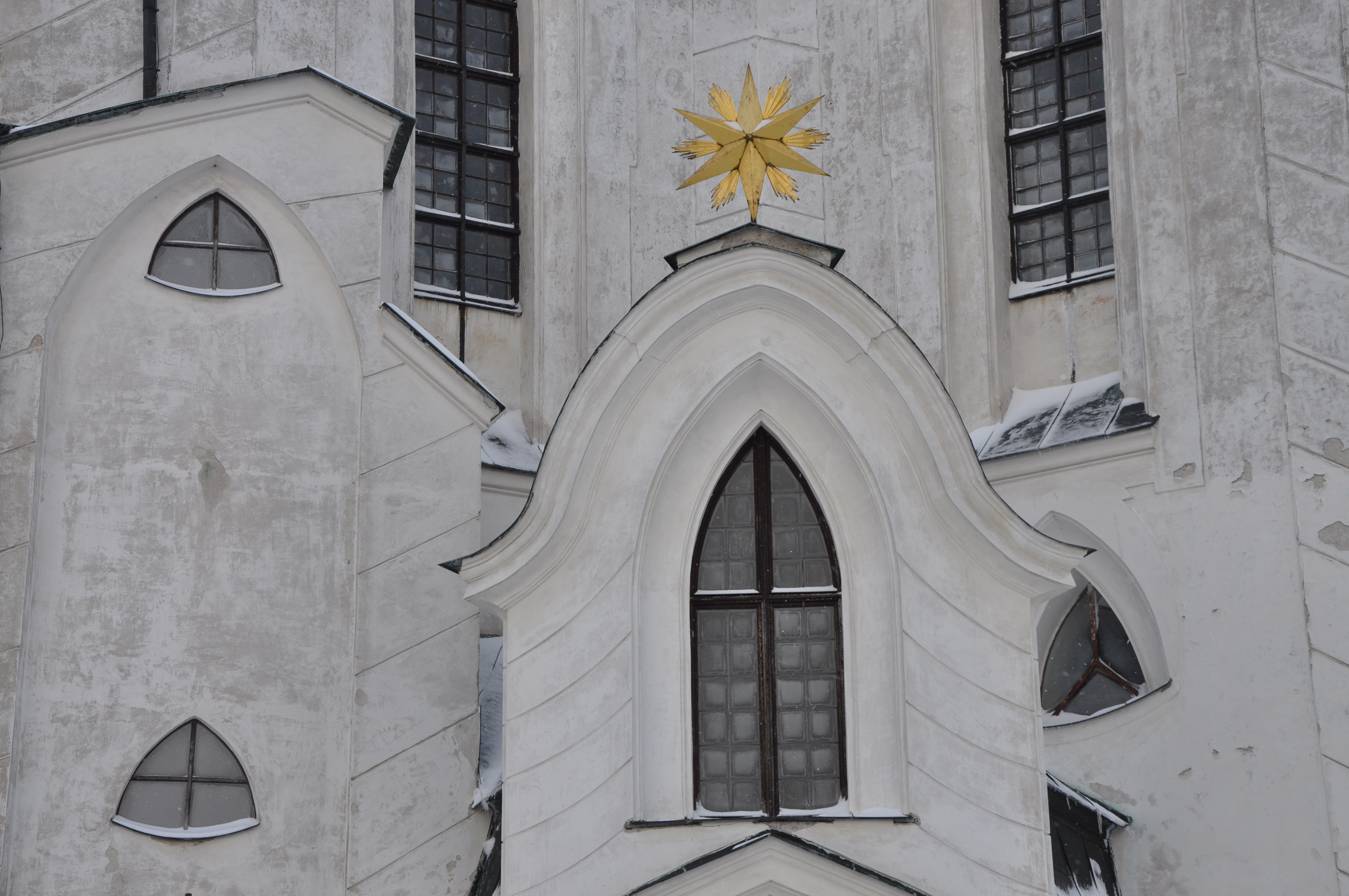
Stellar ornament

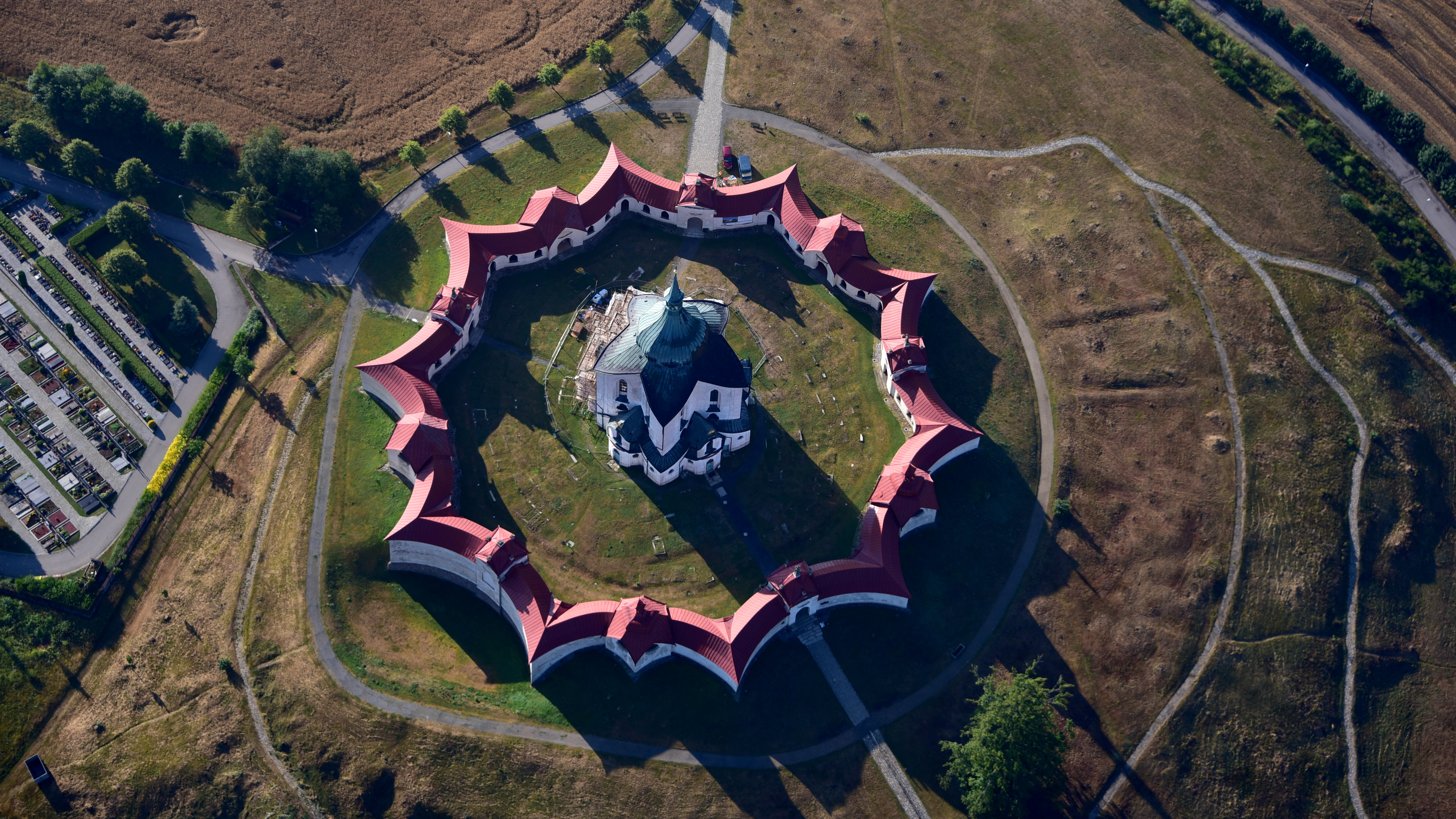
Aerial footage of church

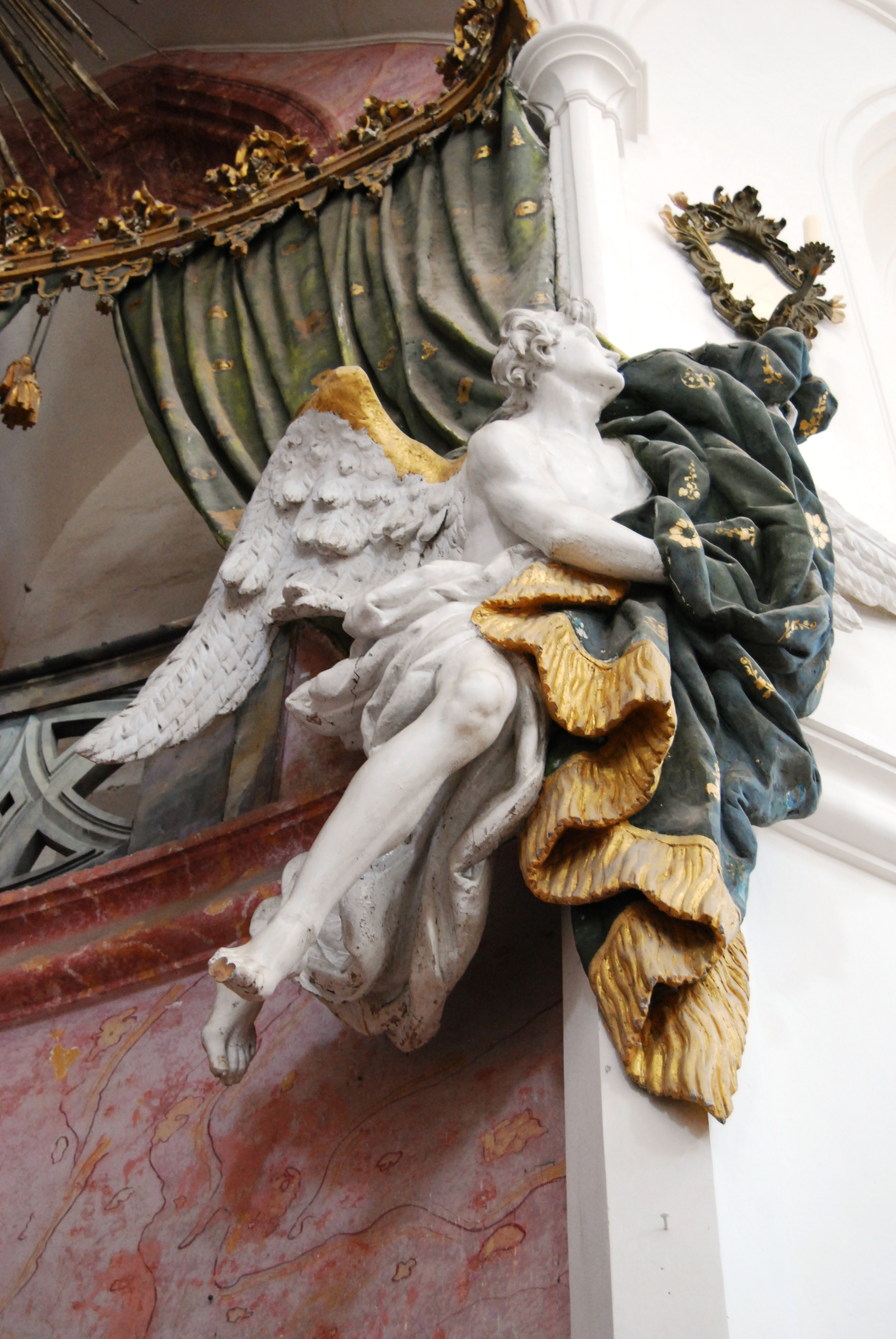
Detail of angel

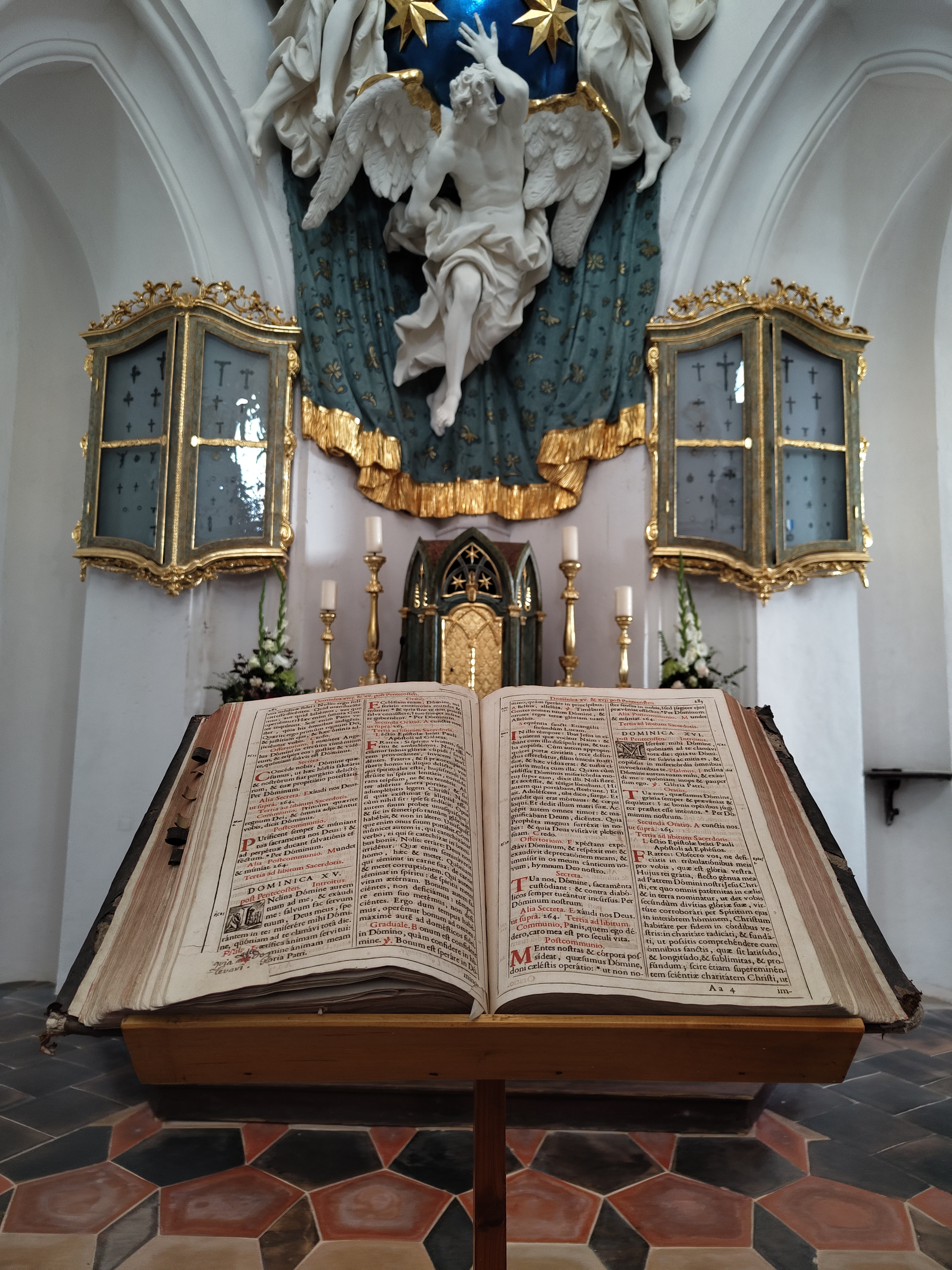
Scripture in front of the main altar

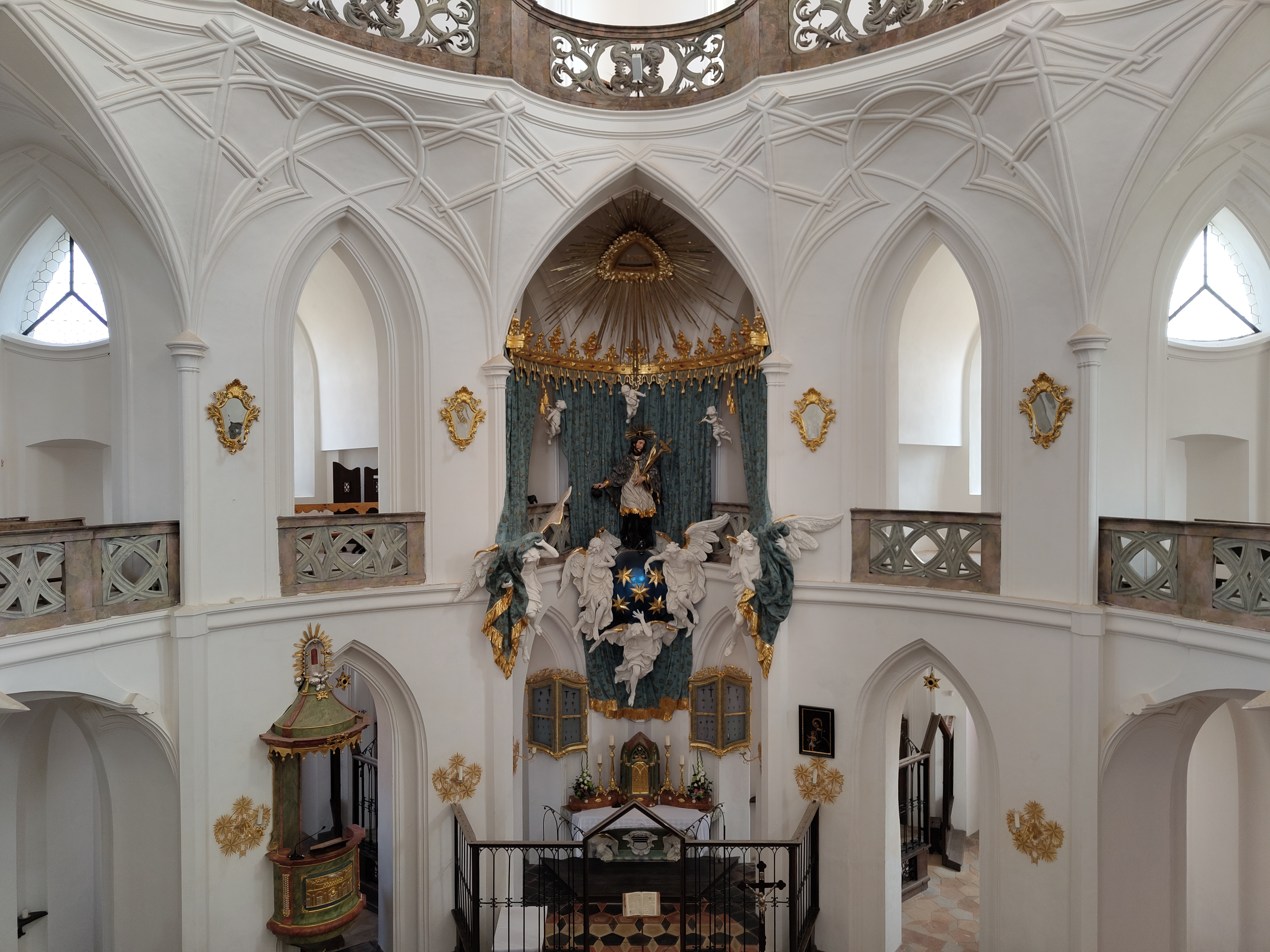
View from second level

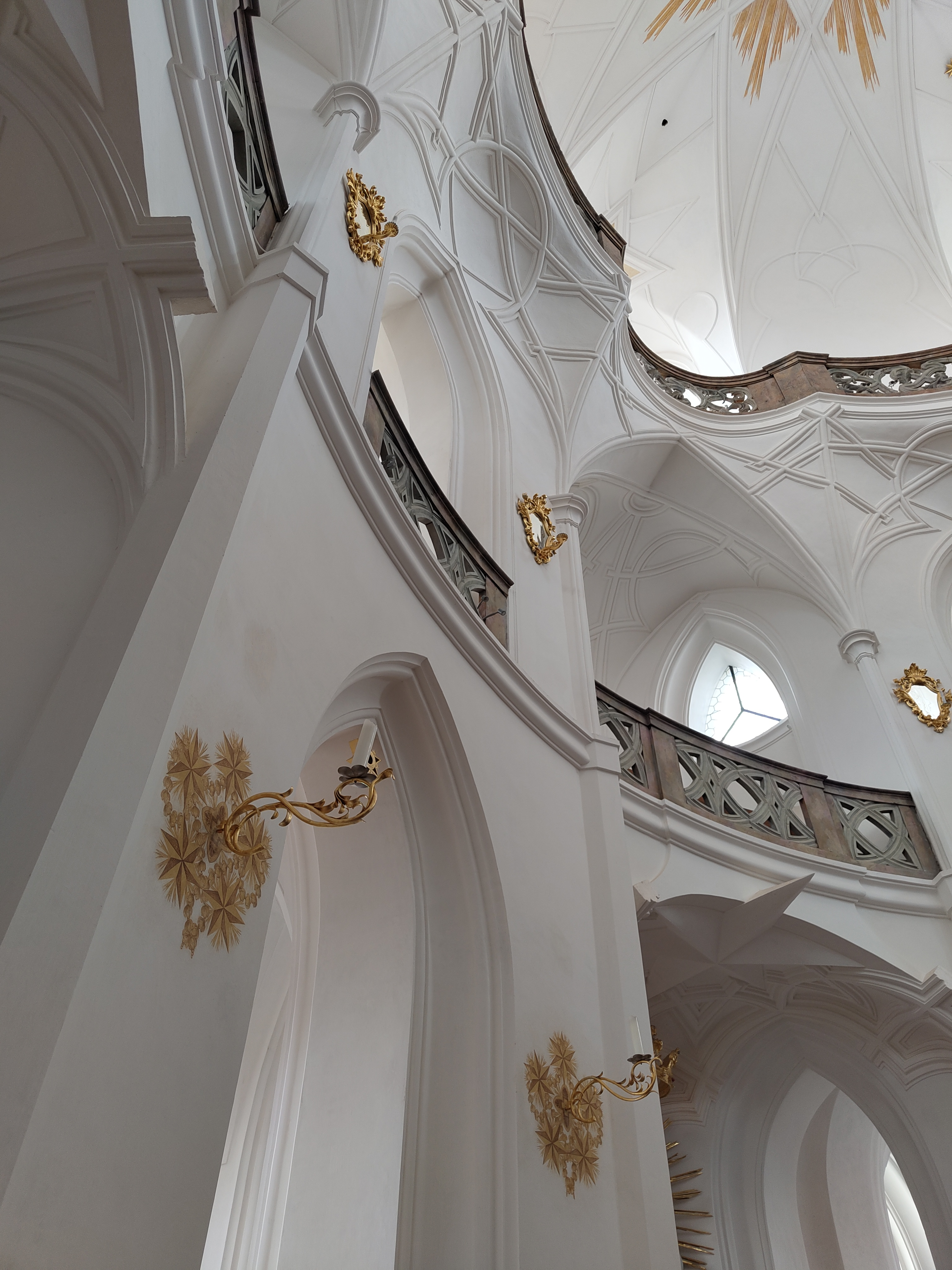
Upward view inside church
