= Church of the Assumption of Our Lady and Saint John the Baptist =

Church in Kutná Hora, Czech Republic

- Kostel Nanebevzetí Panny Marie a svatého Jana Křtitele
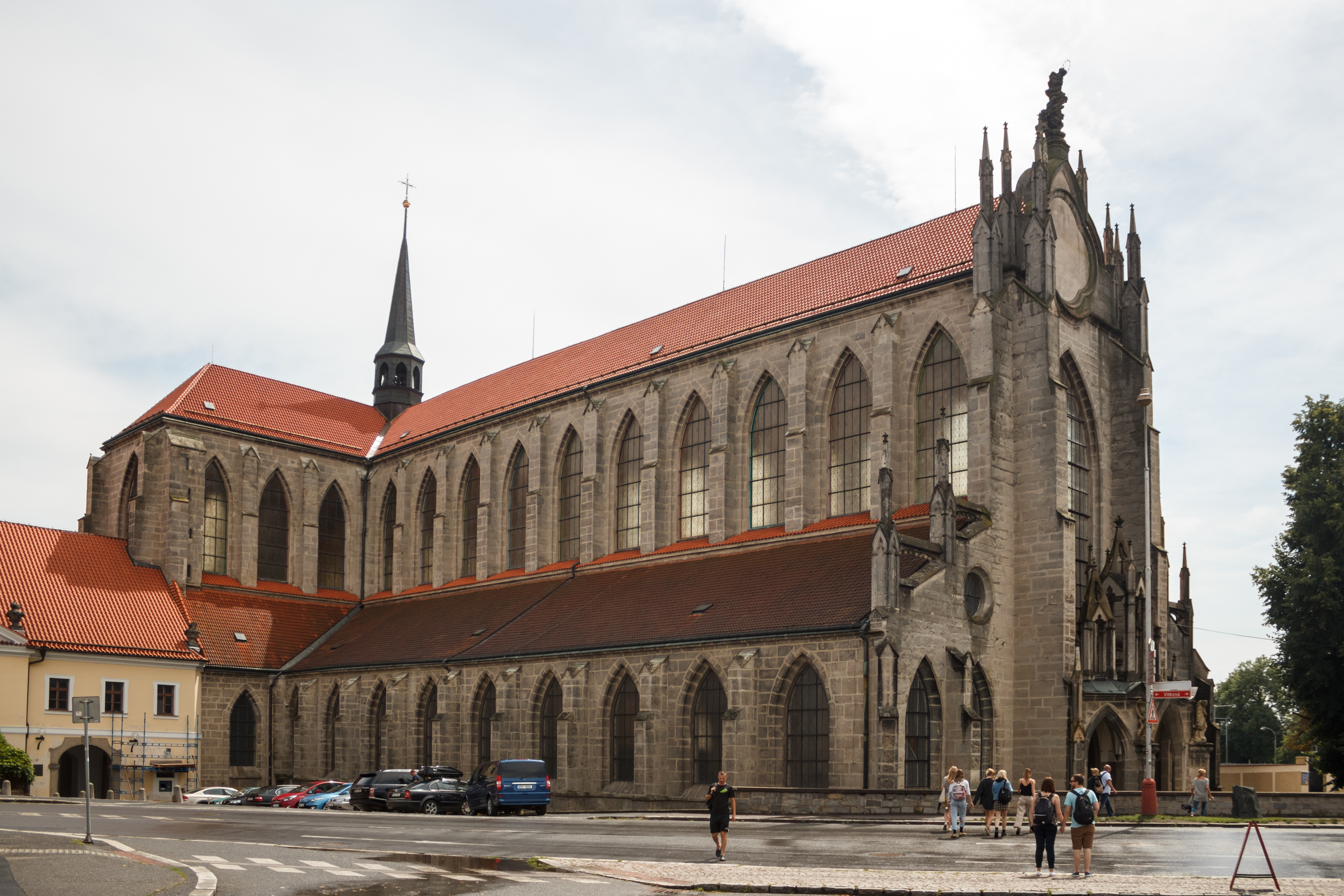

- Location within Czech Republic
- 49°57′59″N 15°17′40″E
- Country: Czech Republic
- Website: Official website

UNESCO World Heritage Site
- Official name: Kutná Hora: Historical Town Centre with the Church of St Barbara and the Cathedral of Our Lady at Sedlec
- Location: Europe
- Criteria: ii, iv
- Reference: 732
- Inscription: 1995 (19th Session)

The Church of the Assumption of Our Lady and Saint John the Baptist (Czech: Kostel Nanebevzetí Panny Marie a svatého Jana Křtitele) is a Gothic and Baroque Gothic church north-east of Kutná Hora in the Czech Republic and is listed in the UNESCO World Heritage List together with the Church of St. Barbara and other monuments in Kutná Hora. It is one of the most important Czech Gothic buildings built in the time of the last Přemyslids and also a very important and one of the oldest examples of the Baroque Gothic style (connected with the Czech Baroque architect Johann Blasius Santini-Aichel).

== History ==
The church was built first in the Gothic style around 1300 as one of the first High Gothic buildings in the Kingdom of Bohemia and as the first church in the kingdom resembling French Gothic cathedrals. It was built on the place of an older church and was a part of the Cistercians Sedlec Abbey, which was the oldest Cistercian abbey in the Czech lands founded in 1142. The abbey was burnt down by the Hussites in 1421 and the church became a ruin for the next two centuries.

In 1700, the abbot of the Sedlec Abbey Jindřich Snopek decided to rebuild the old church. The reconstruction was conducted by the architect Pavel Ignác Bayer. After three years Bayer was replaced by Johann Santini-Aichel, who had worked for the Cistercians already in Zbraslav. He completed the reconstruction of the church in his original style called Baroque Gothic. This reconstruction was celebrated for its impressive vaulting and facade as well as for its antechamber, which had been decorated by the statues made by Matěj Václav Jäckel. The church was consecrated in 1708.

Although the church was rebuilt in the early 18th century his eastern part with side chapels, choir and transept should have preserved its original appearance (from outside).

The latest restoration of the church took place in 2001.

== Gallery ==
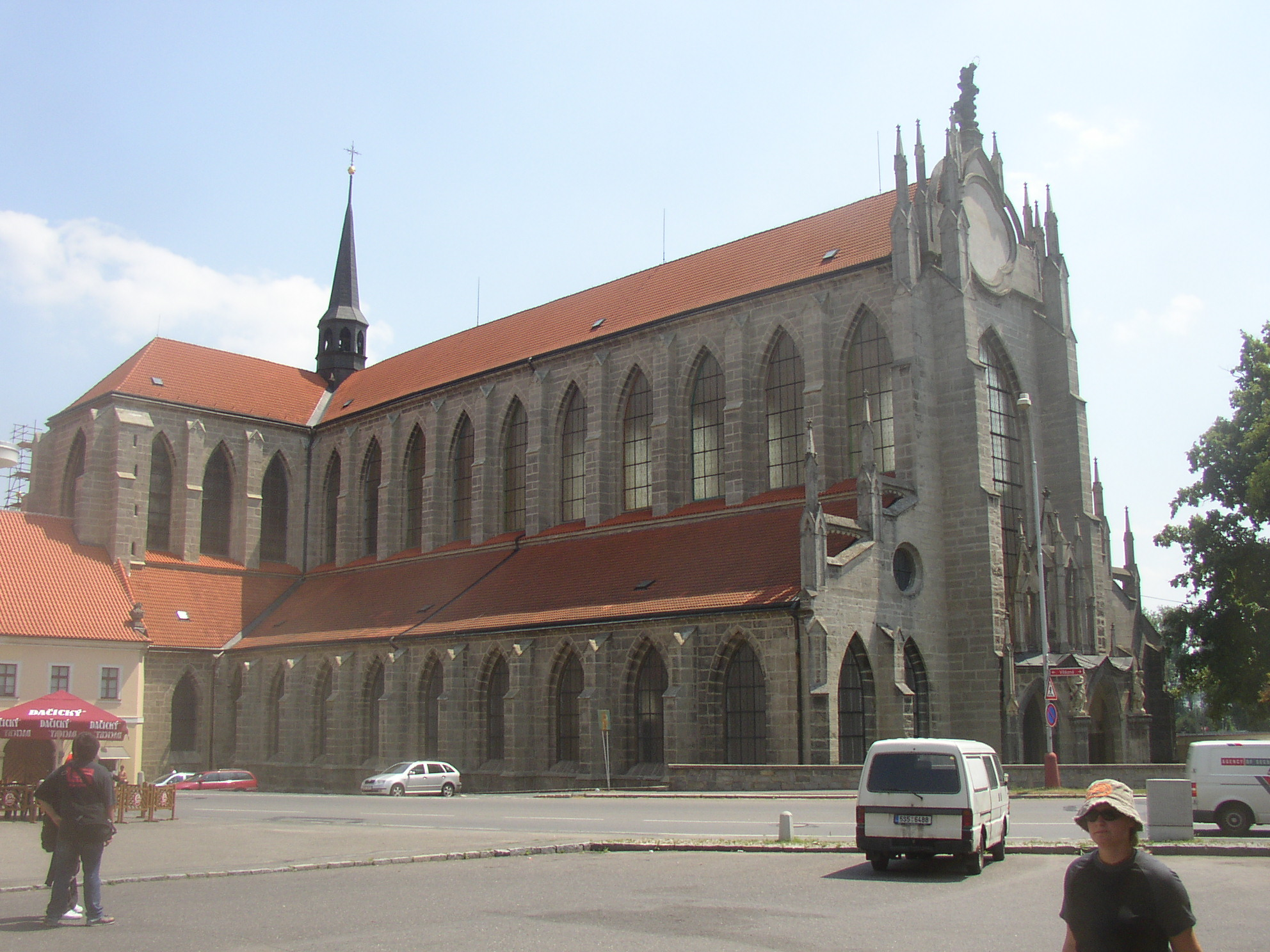
Sedlec Cathedral

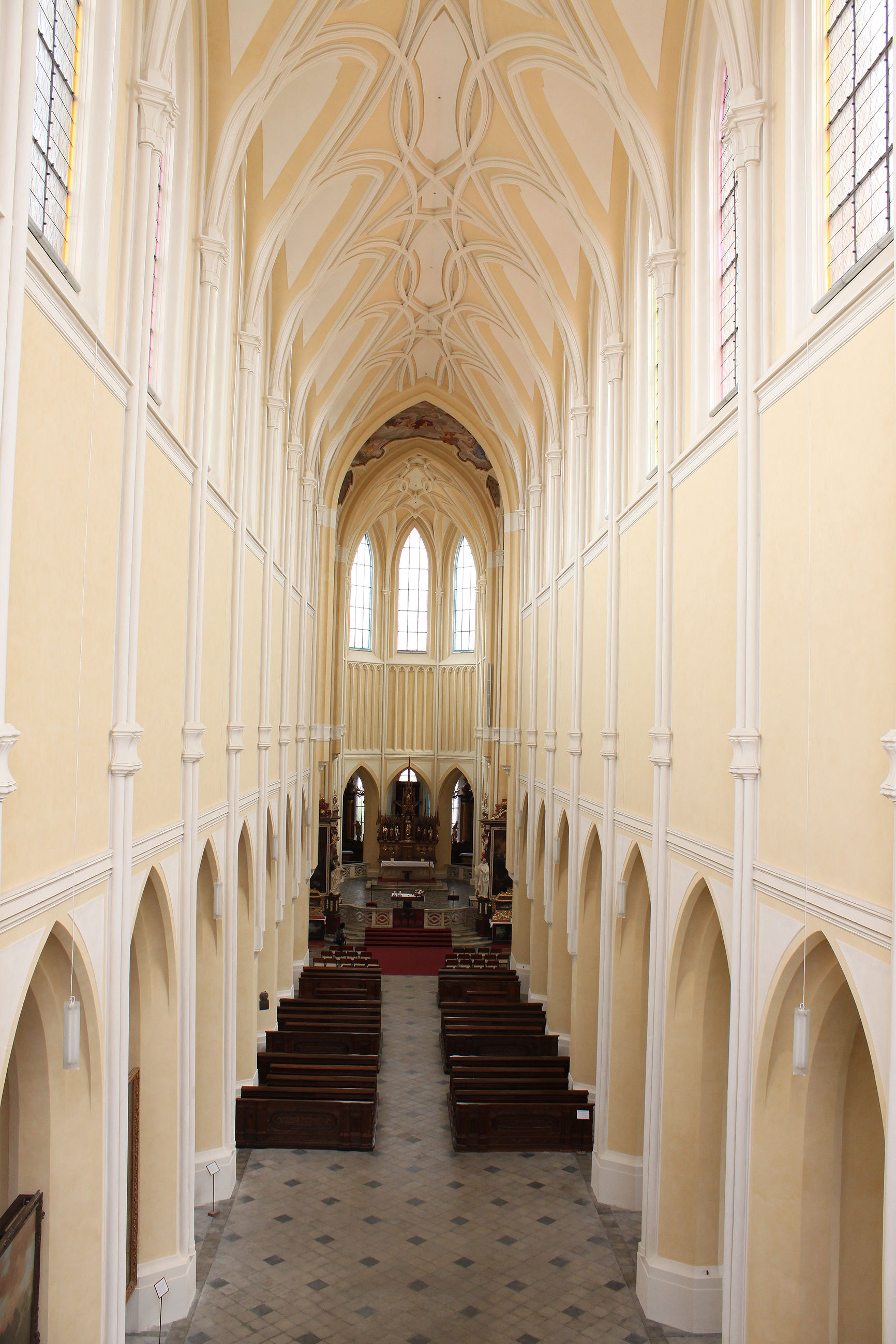
Interior of the church.

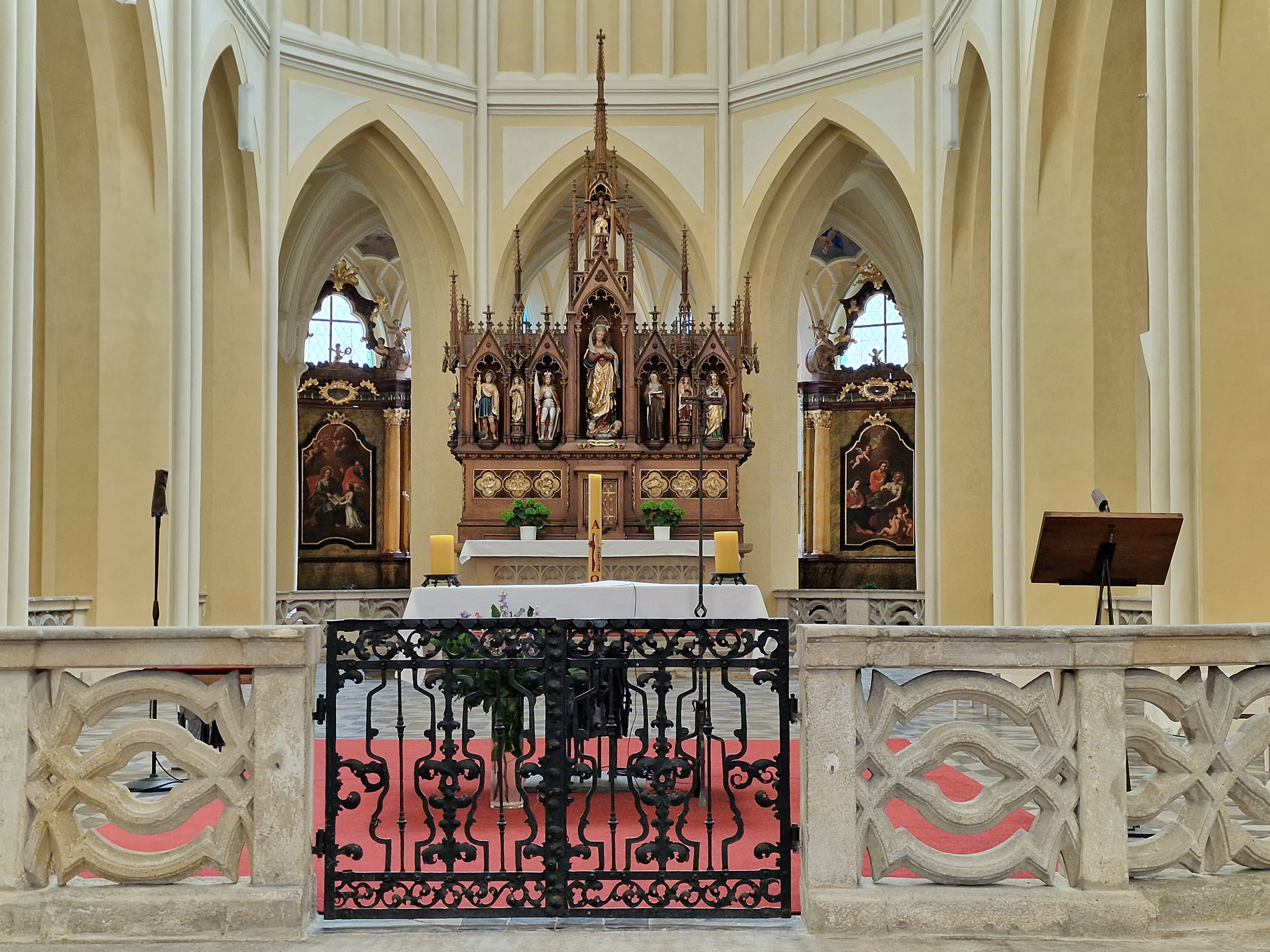
Main altar.

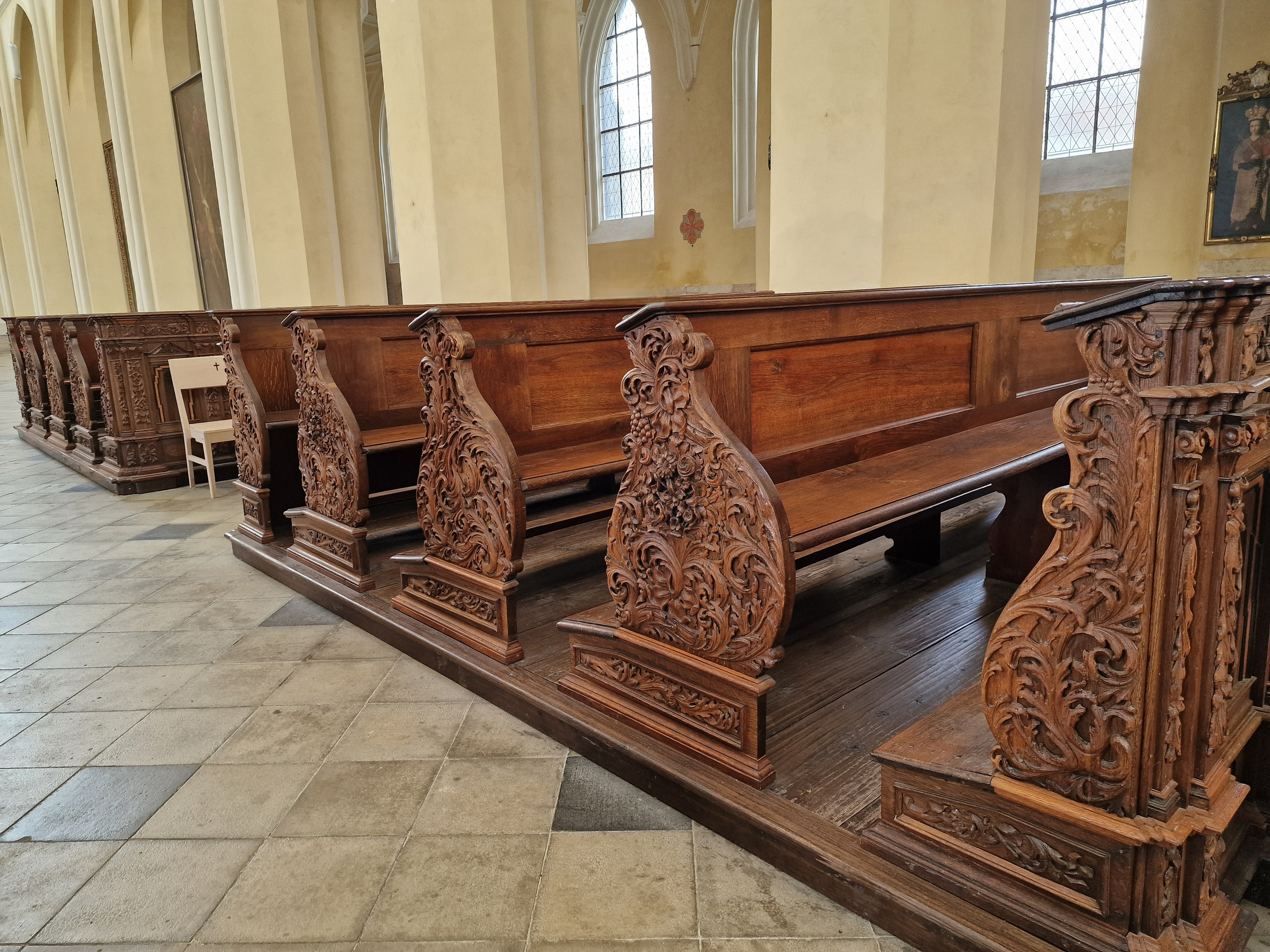
Pews.

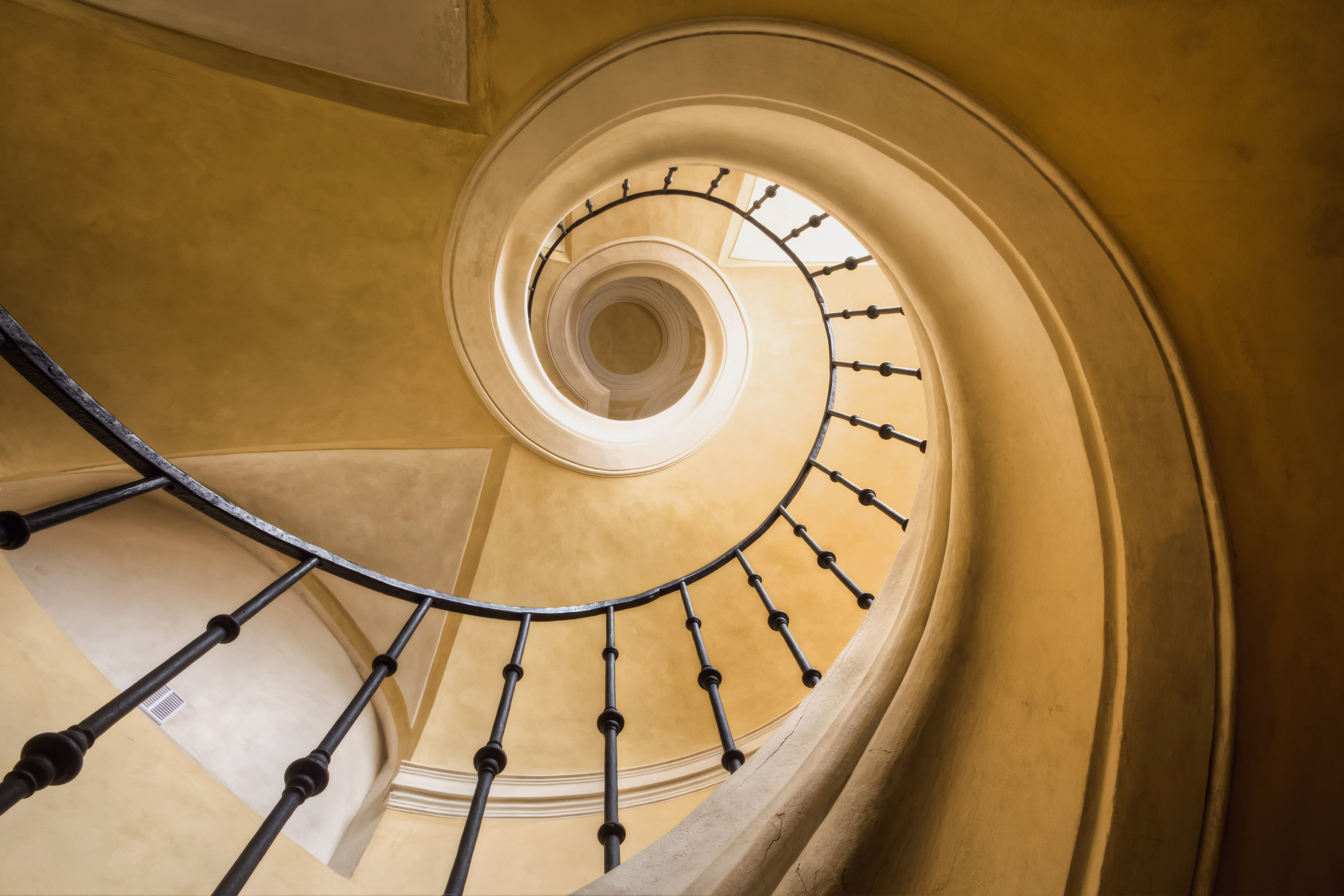
Stairs

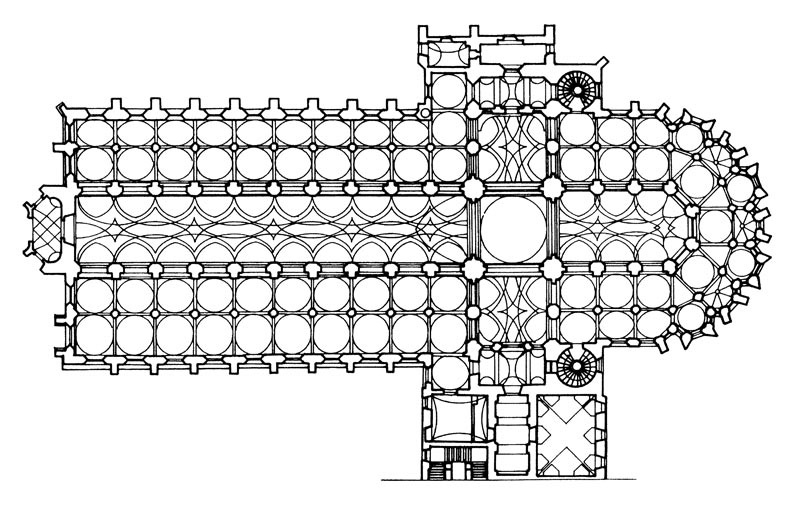
Ground plan of the church.

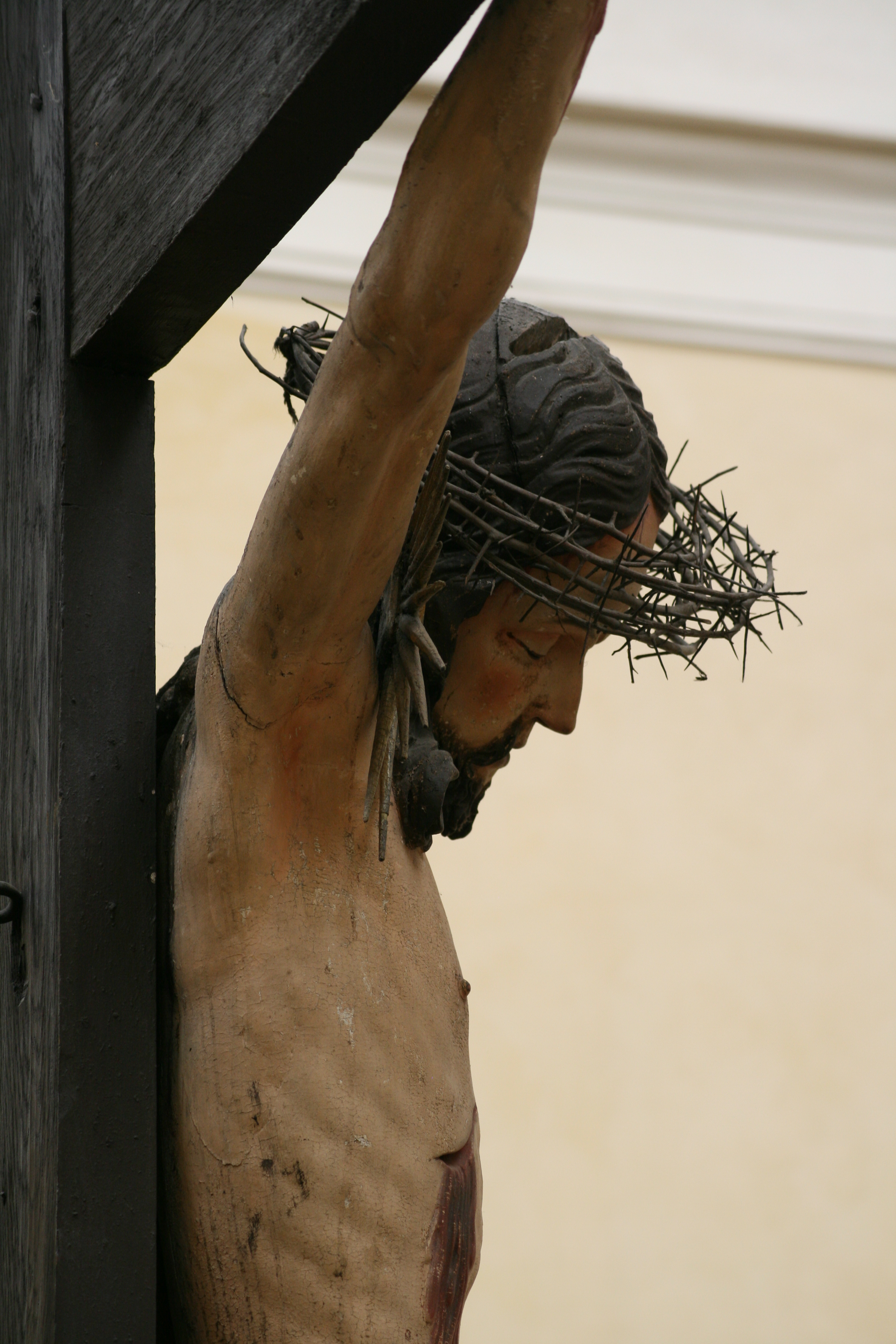
Crucifix

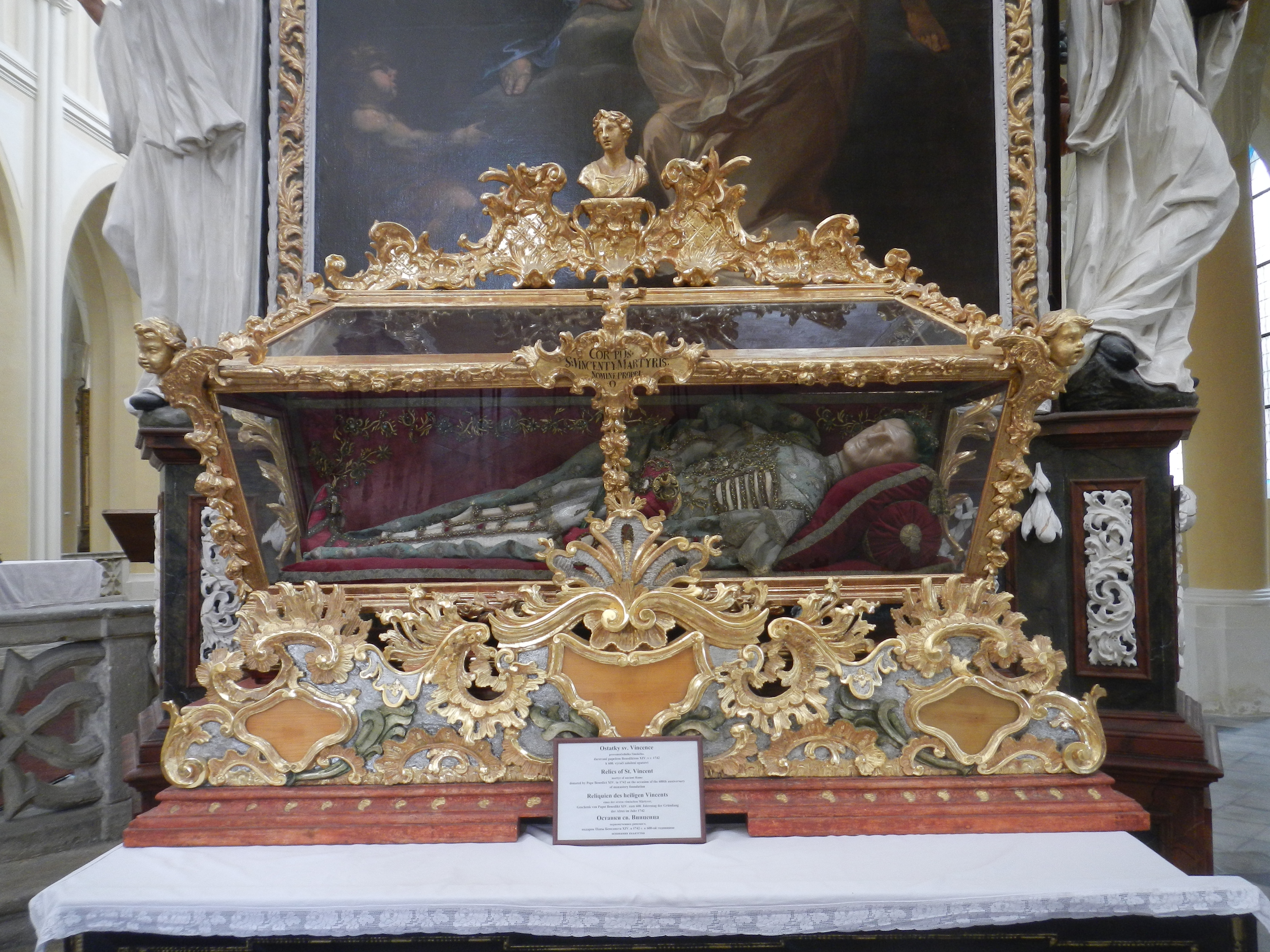
Reliquary with the relics of Vincent of Saragossa

== See also ==
- List of Gothic Cathedrals in Europe

== Sources ==
- Pavel Kalina,The Hybrid Architecture of Jan Blažej Santini-Aichl and Patterns of Memory in the Post-Reformation Bohemia, Umění/Art LVIII, Issue 1, 2010, p. 42-56.
