= Obyčtov =

- Municipality
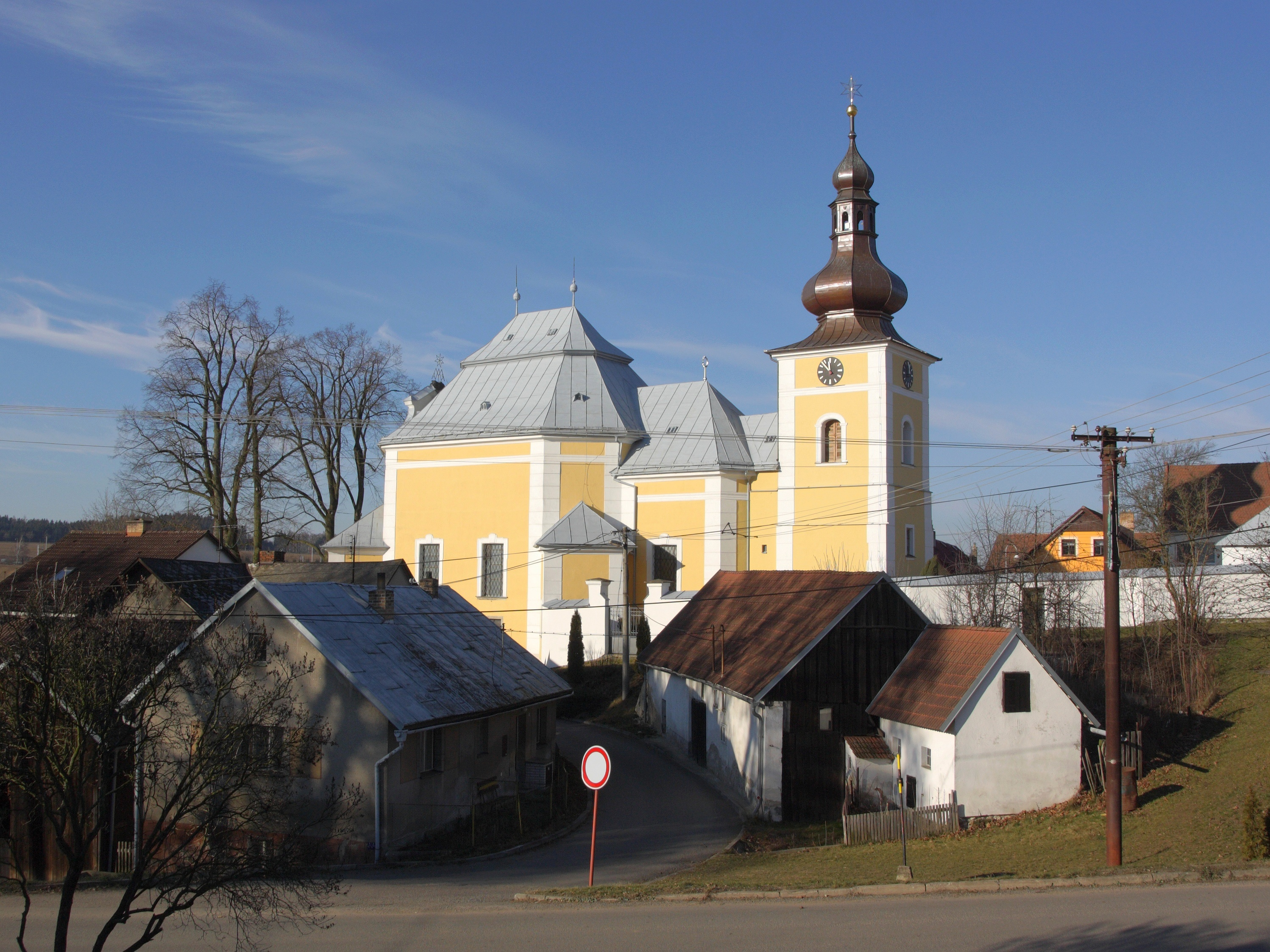
- Church of the Visitation of the Virgin Mary

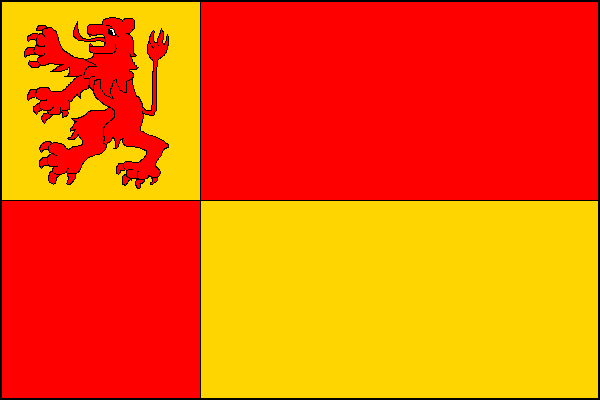
- Flag Coat of arms

- Location in the Czech Republic
- Coordinates: 49°30′0″N 16°0′6″E
- Country: Czech Republic
- Region: Vysočina
- District: Žďár nad Sázavou
- First mentioned: 1341

Area
  - Total: 7.77 km^{2} (3.00 sq mi)
- Elevation: 540 m (1,770 ft)

Population (2026-01-01)
  - Total: 453
  - Density: 58.3/km^{2} (151/sq mi)
- Time zone: UTC+1 (CET)
  - Summer (DST): UTC+2 (CEST)
- Postal code: 591 01
- Website: www.obyctov.cz

Obyčtov is a municipality and village in Žďár nad Sázavou District in the Vysočina Region of the Czech Republic. It has about 500 inhabitants.

Obyčtov lies approximately 10 kilometres (6 mi) south-east of Žďár nad Sázavou, 33 km (21 mi) east of Jihlava, and 132 km (82 mi) south-east of Prague.

== Demographics ==
Historical population
Year	Pop.	±%
1869	422	—
1880	413	−2.1%
1890	421	+1.9%
1900	407	−3.3%
1910	405	−0.5%
1921	378	−6.7%
1930	391	+3.4%
1950	351	−10.2%
1961	369	+5.1%
1970	364	−1.4%
1980	381	+4.7%
1991	385	+1.0%
2001	389	+1.0%
2011	390	+0.3%
2021	413	+5.9%
Source: Censuses
