= Netín =

- Municipality
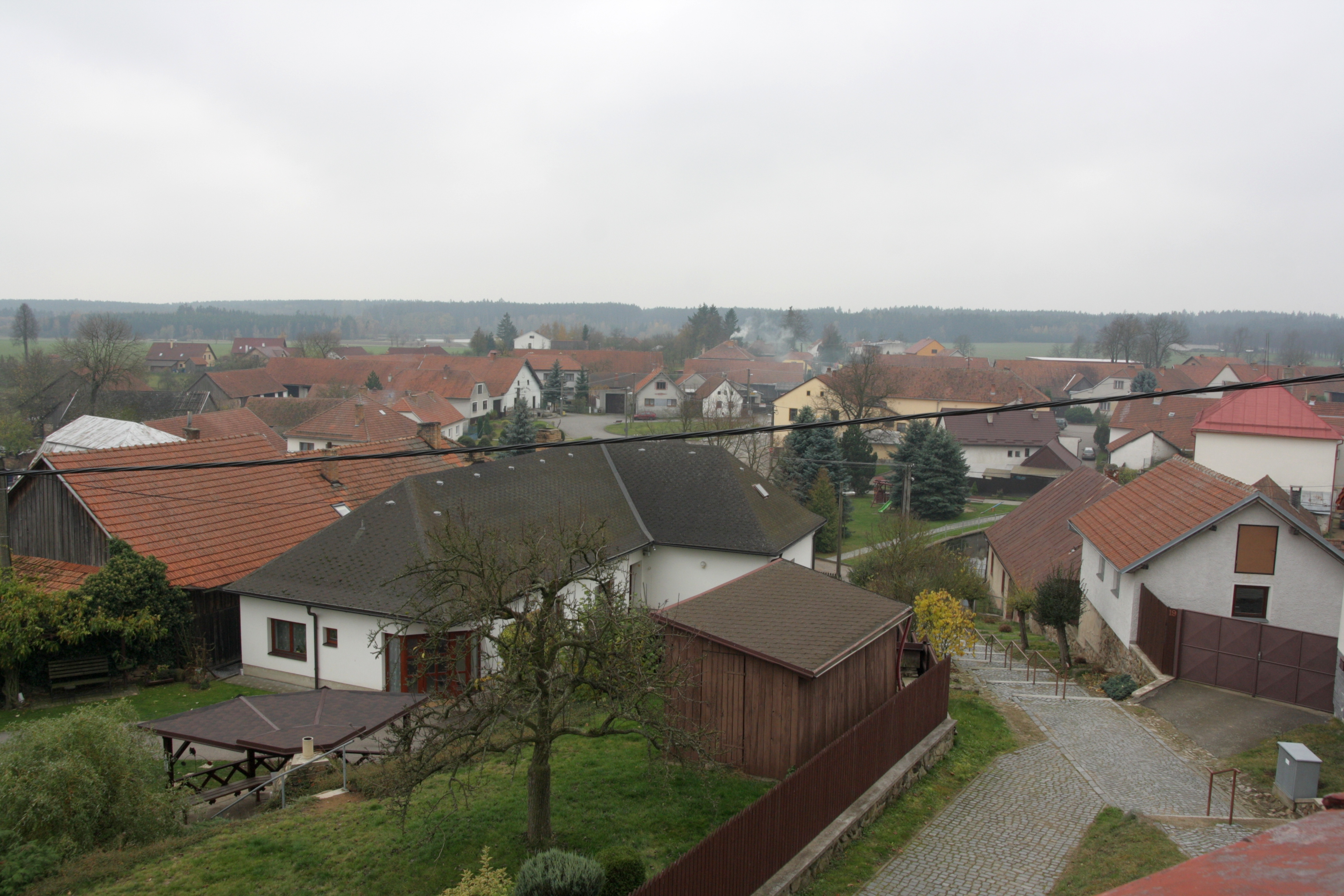
- View towards the centre of Netín

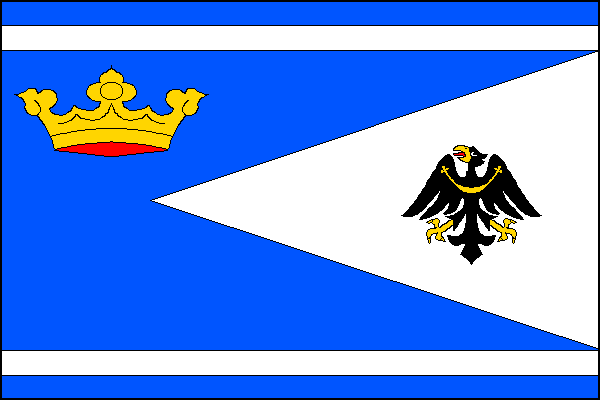
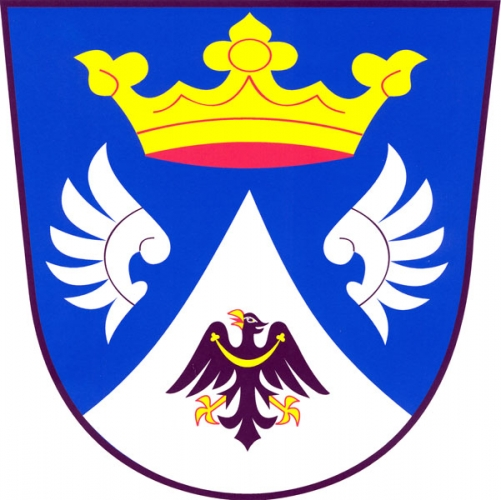
- Flag Coat of arms

- Location in the Czech Republic
- Coordinates: 49°24′47″N 15°57′3″E
- Country: Czech Republic
- Region: Vysočina
- District: Žďár nad Sázavou
- First mentioned: 1156

Area
  - Total: 7.80 km^{2} (3.01 sq mi)
- Elevation: 538 m (1,765 ft)

Population (2026-01-01)
  - Total: 403
  - Density: 51.7/km^{2} (134/sq mi)
- Time zone: UTC+1 (CET)
  - Summer (DST): UTC+2 (CEST)
- Postal code: 594 44
- Website: www.obecnetin.cz

Netín is a municipality and village in Žďár nad Sázavou District in the Vysočina Region of the Czech Republic. It has about 400 inhabitants.

== Administrative division ==
Netín consists of two municipal parts (in brackets population according to the 2021 census):

- Netín (322)
- Záseka (26)

== Etymology ==
The initial name of Netín was Vznětín. The name was probably derived from the personal name Vznata, referring to one of the nobles of this name from the Meziříčský of Lomnice family.

== Geography ==
Netín is located about 16 kilometres (10 mi) south of Žďár nad Sázavou and 26 km (16 mi) east of Jihlava. It lies in the Křižanov Highlands. The highest point is the hill Strážnice at 609 m (1,998 ft) above sea level. The municipal territory is rich in small streams and fishponds. The largest of the fishponds is Velký netínský rybník with an area of 36.4 ha (90 acres).

== History ==
The first written mention of Netín is in a forgery from the end of the 12th century, which states the year 1156. The village was the property of the Benedictine monastery in Třebíč at that time. In the second half of the 15th century, large fishponds were built around the village by Jan Meziříčský of Lomnice. From 1556, Netín belonged to the Stránecká Zhoř estate. In 1729, Netín and Stránecká Zhoř were annexed to the Velké Meziříčí estate. In 1882, the village was damaged by a large fire, which destroyed 37 houses and a school.

== Demographics ==
Historical population

| Year | Pop. | ±% |
|---|---|---|
| 1869 | 409 | — |
| 1880 | 443 | +8.3% |
| 1890 | 431 | −2.7% |
| 1900 | 414 | −3.9% |
| 1910 | 410 | −1.0% |

| Year | Pop. | ±% |
|---|---|---|
| 1921 | 409 | −0.2% |
| 1930 | 406 | −0.7% |
| 1950 | 342 | −15.8% |
| 1961 | 379 | +10.8% |
| 1970 | 350 | −7.7% |

| Year | Pop. | ±% |
|---|---|---|
| 1980 | 338 | −3.4% |
| 1991 | 327 | −3.3% |
| 2001 | 315 | −3.7% |
| 2011 | 329 | +4.4% |
| 2021 | 348 | +5.8% |

Source: Censuses

== Transport ==
There are no railways or major roads passing through the municipality.

== Sights ==
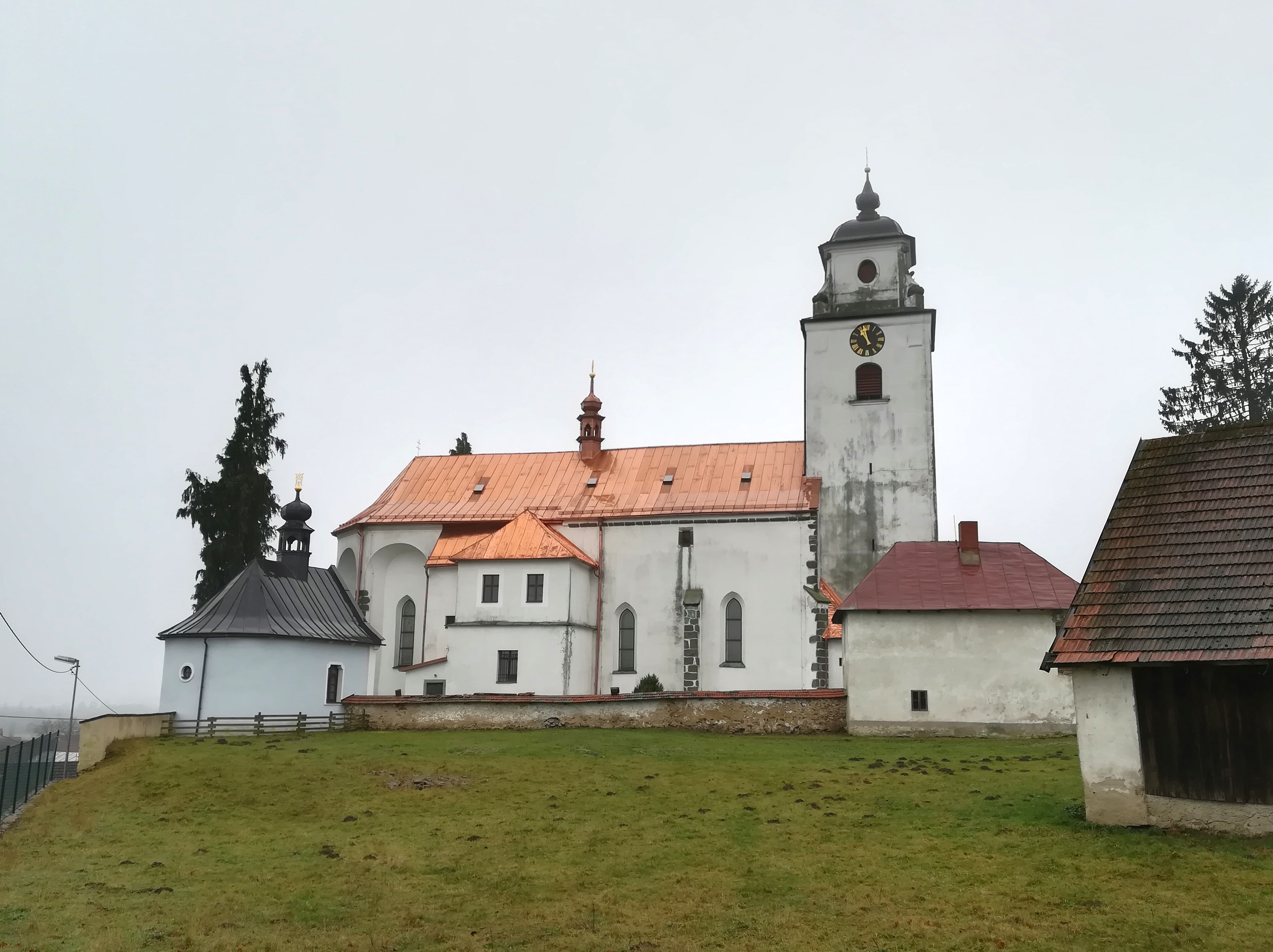
Church of the Assumption of the Virgin Mary

The main landmark of Netín is the Church of the Assumption of the Virgin Mary. It was built in the Gothic style in the 13th century, but it has a Romanesque core. In the 15th century, it was fortified. In 1739–1740, the church was rebuilt in the Baroque style. On a hill above the church is the tomb of the Lobkowicz family. The road from the church to the tomb is lined with the Stations of the Cross.
