= Bezdědovice =

- Municipality
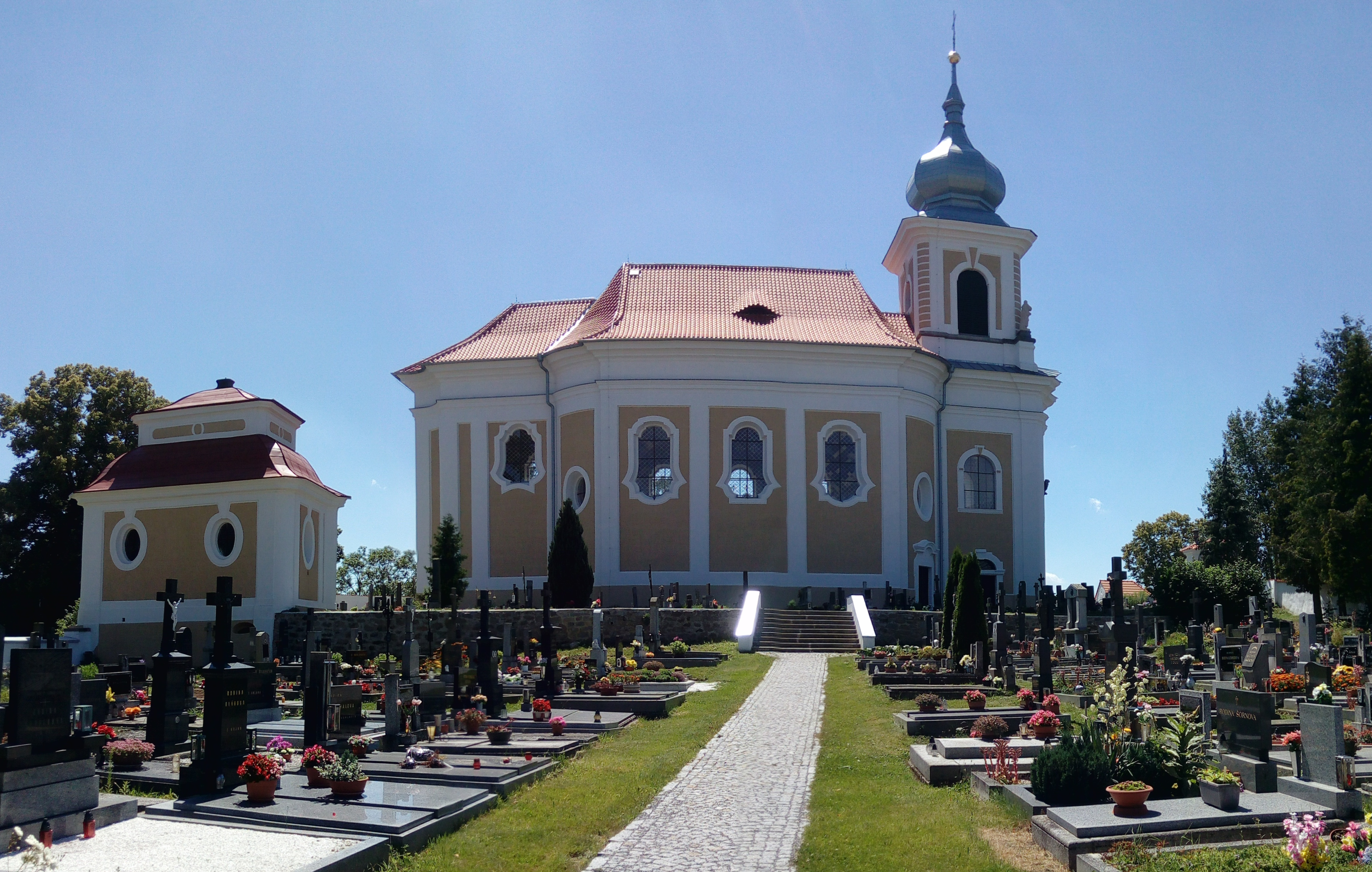
- Church of Saint John the Baptist in Paštiky

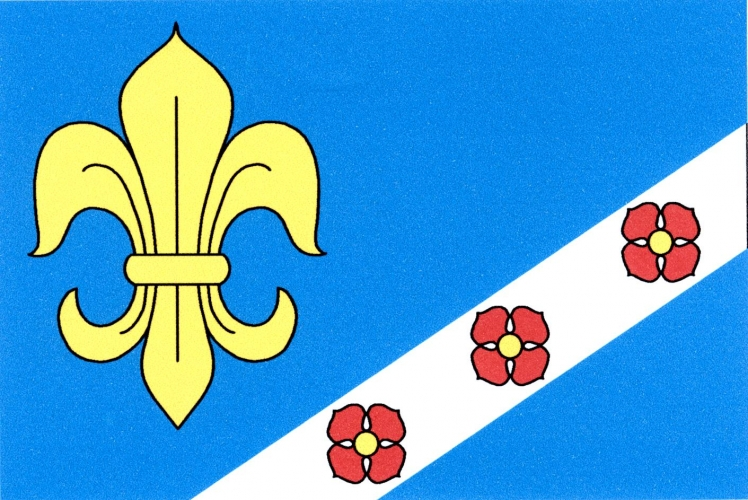
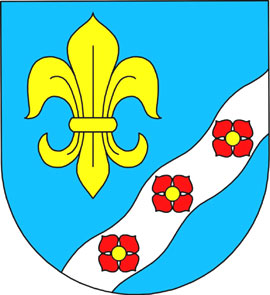
- Flag Coat of arms

- Location in the Czech Republic
- Coordinates: 49°26′39″N 13°52′48″E
- Country: Czech Republic
- Region: South Bohemian
- District: Strakonice
- First mentioned: 1186

Area
  - Total: 5.81 km^{2} (2.24 sq mi)
- Elevation: 448 m (1,470 ft)

Population (2026-01-01)
  - Total: 383
  - Density: 65.9/km^{2} (171/sq mi)
- Time zone: UTC+1 (CET)
  - Summer (DST): UTC+2 (CEST)
- Postal code: 388 01
- Website: www.bezdedovice.cz

Bezdědovice is a municipality and village in Strakonice District in the South Bohemian Region of the Czech Republic. It has about 400 inhabitants.

Bezdědovice lies approximately 22 kilometres (14 mi) north of Strakonice, 69 km (43 mi) north-west of České Budějovice, and 81 km (50 mi) south-west of Prague.

== Administrative division ==
Bezdědovice consists of three municipal parts (in brackets population according to the 2021 census):

- Bezdědovice (283)
- Dobšice (51)
- Paštiky (20)

== Demographics ==
Historical population
| Year | Pop. | ±% |
|---|---|---|
| 1869 | 574 | — |
| 1880 | 643 | +12.0% |
| 1890 | 581 | −9.6% |
| 1900 | 589 | +1.4% |
| 1910 | 556 | −5.6% |
| 1921 | 492 | −11.5% |
| 1930 | 503 | +2.2% |
| 1950 | 403 | −19.9% |
| 1961 | 409 | +1.5% |
| 1970 | 380 | −7.1% |
| 1980 | 323 | −15.0% |
| 1991 | 324 | +0.3% |
| 2001 | 306 | −5.6% |
| 2011 | 340 | +11.1% |
| 2021 | 354 | +4.1% |
Source: Censuses

== Sights ==
The most valuable building is the Church of Saint John the Baptist, located in Paštiky. It was rebuilt in the Baroque style by the architect Kilian Ignaz Dientzenhofer in 1747–1752, on the order of Countess Serényi. The church is a single-aisled building ended in a rectangular presbytery with richly decorated cornices in a Rococo style. Next to the church is a cemetery with a mortuary chapel under which is the family crypt of the Hildprandt family. The chapel was also built by Dientzenhofer.
