= Church of Saint John the Baptist (Paštiky) =

Coordinates: 49°26′35″N 13°53′52″E

- Church of Saint John the Baptist
- Location: Paštiky, South Bohemian Region, Czech Republic

History
- Dedication: Saint John the Baptist

Architecture
- Functional status: Active

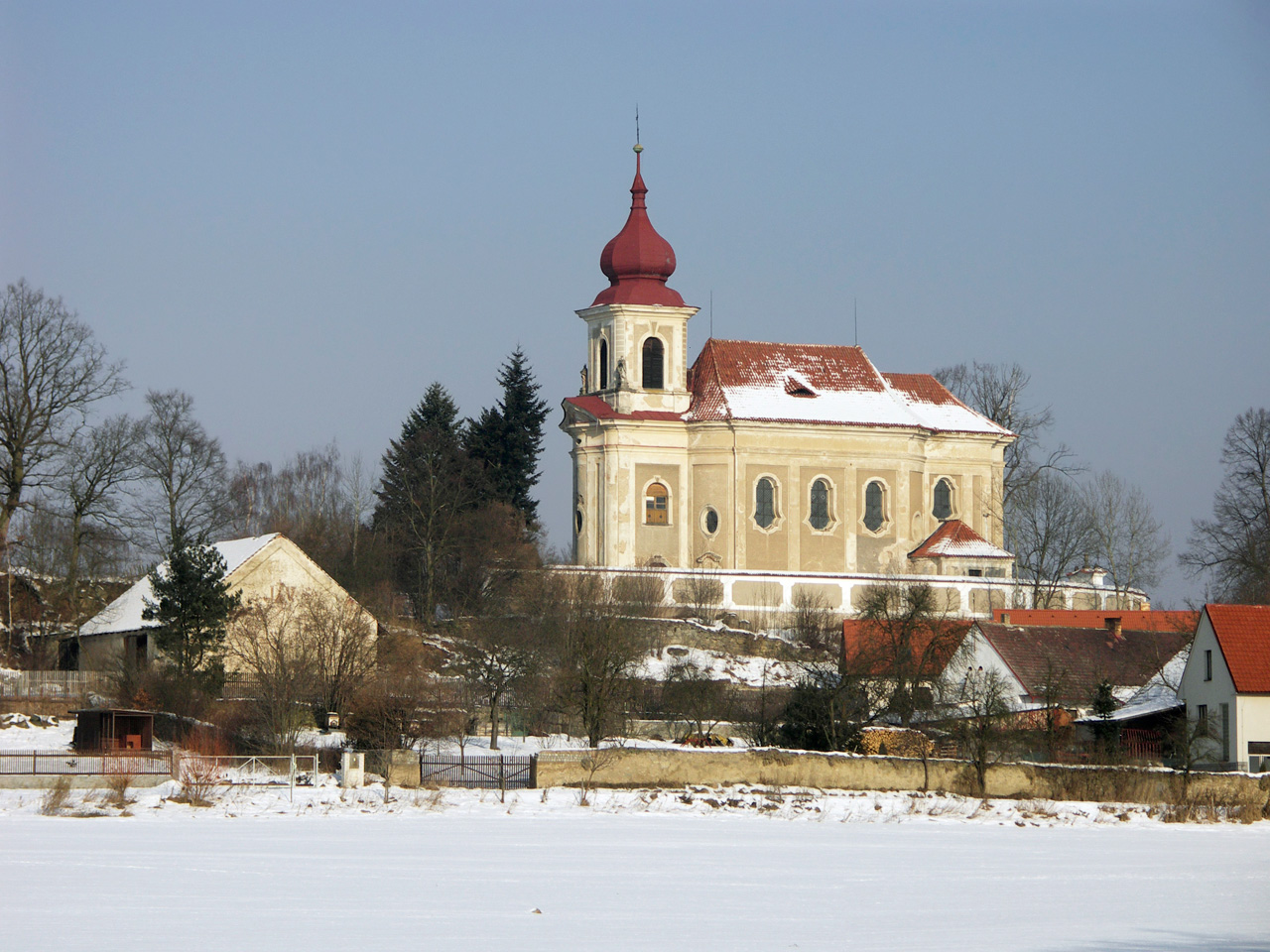
Paštiky (CZE) - church.jpg

Church of St. John the Baptist (Czech: Kostel svatého Jana Křtitele) is a church in the village of Paštiky within Bezdědovice in the South Bohemian Region of the Czech Republic.

== History ==
It was built between 1747 and 1753 on the site of a former church according to the plans of the Baroque architect Kilian Ignaz Dientzenhofer. The interior decoration, in the same style as the exterior of the building, is the work of the sculptor Ferdinand Ublaker and the painter J. V. Spitzer, both from the mid-18th century.

It is a single nave building with a square chancel, both richly articulated by cornices and pilasters. The nave is separated by a vaulted arch, and its termination forms a gallery with Rococo organs. The exterior walls of the church with its tower are decorated with additional massive and richly articulated cornices. Above the entrance to the churchyard are two granite sculptures of skulls, the so-called "Paštiky Death". In March 2020, they were stolen, but someone returned them to the church overnight on March 21–22, 2020.

The church is located near a cemetery, the eastern end of which is guarded by a gate adorned with stone skulls and a cup. The cemetery chapel was also built according to Dientzenhofer's plans, with a crypt located beneath it. In the mid-19th century, this chapel was modified into the family tomb of the Hildprandt family from Blatná.

The location of the church in the landscape on a high terrace with a double staircase, and its architecture from the end of Dientzenhofer's life, is a harmonious work of three prominent Baroque artists of their time.

=== Architectural Heritage Rescue Program ===
As part of the Architectural Heritage Rescue Program between 1995 and 2014, 4,570,000 CZK was spent on the restoration of the church.

Funds allocated (in thousands of CZK)
Year	1998	1999	2000	2001	2002	2003
Amount	1 000	1 000	900	790	600	280

=== Restoration of the church ===
In 2018–2019, the church underwent reconstruction as part of a project funded by the EU and the Blatná parish (over 20 million CZK). The renovation included the roofs and facades of the buildings on the premises, stained glass windows, walls, and sidewalks, a new spire was gilded, and its 250-year-old original statues of St. Elizabeth and St. Joseph were replaced with replicas. The church contains commemorative coins and a list of local children born in 2019.
