= Úterý =

- Town
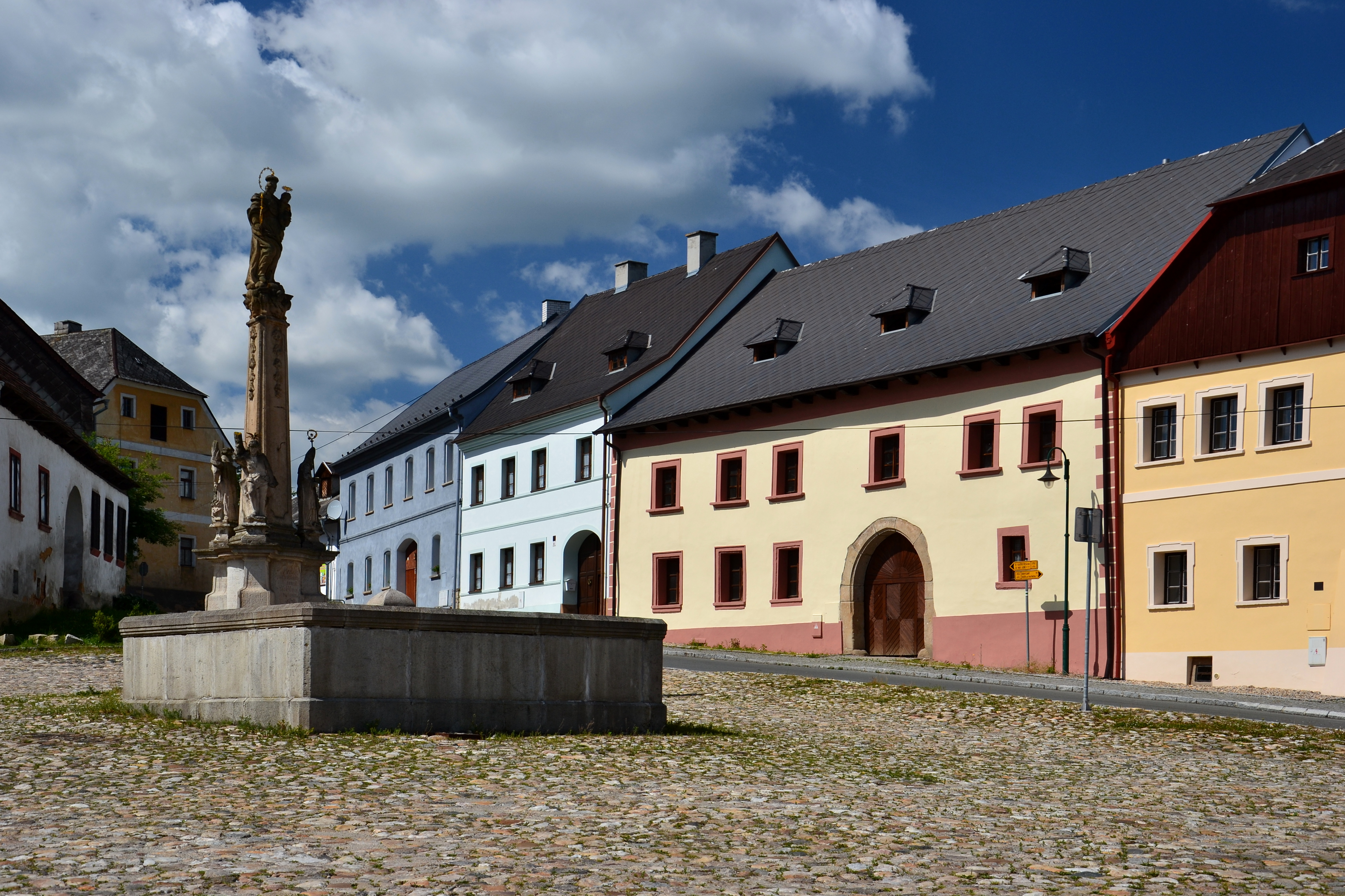
- Town square

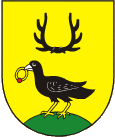
- Coat of arms

- Location in the Czech Republic
- Coordinates: 49°56′26″N 13°0′9″E
- Country: Czech Republic
- Region: Plzeň
- District: Plzeň-North
- First mentioned: 1233

Government
  - Mayor: Václav Konstantinovič

Area
  - Total: 25.92 km^{2} (10.01 sq mi)
- Elevation: 485 m (1,591 ft)

Population (2026-01-01)
  - Total: 434
  - Density: 16.7/km^{2} (43.4/sq mi)
- Time zone: UTC+1 (CET)
  - Summer (DST): UTC+2 (CEST)
- Postal code: 330 40
- Website: www.mesto-utery.cz

Úterý (Czech pronunciation: [ˈuːtɛriː]; German: Neumarkt) is a town in Plzeň-North District in the Plzeň Region of the Czech Republic. It has about 400 inhabitants. The historic town centre is well preserved and is protected as an urban monument zone.

== Administrative division ==
Úterý consists of three municipal parts (in brackets population according to the 2021 census):

- Úterý (316)
- Olešovice (87)
- Vidžín (28)

== Etymology ==
The name Úterý literally means 'Tuesday' in Czech. The settlement was probably founded on Tuesday, or markets were held on Tuesdays.

== Geography ==
Úterý is located about 33 kilometres (21 mi) northwest of Plzeň. It lies in the Teplá Highlands. The highest point is the hill Stěnský vrch at 760 m (2,493 ft) above sea level. The stream Úterský potok flows through the town.

== History ==
The town was probably founded in 11th century, however the first written mention is from 1233.

== Demographics ==
Historical population

| Year | Pop. | ±% |
|---|---|---|
| 1869 | 1,597 | — |
| 1880 | 1,735 | +8.6% |
| 1890 | 1,772 | +2.1% |
| 1900 | 1,630 | −8.0% |
| 1910 | 1,607 | −1.4% |

| Year | Pop. | ±% |
|---|---|---|
| 1921 | 1,488 | −7.4% |
| 1930 | 1,373 | −7.7% |
| 1950 | 509 | −62.9% |
| 1961 | 507 | −0.4% |
| 1970 | 494 | −2.6% |

| Year | Pop. | ±% |
|---|---|---|
| 1980 | 399 | −19.2% |
| 1991 | 369 | −7.5% |
| 2001 | 384 | +4.1% |
| 2011 | 416 | +8.3% |
| 2021 | 431 | +3.6% |

Source: Censuses

== Economy ==
Almost half of houses in Úterý are recreational objects.

== Transport ==
There are no railways or major roads passing through the municipal territory.

== Sights ==
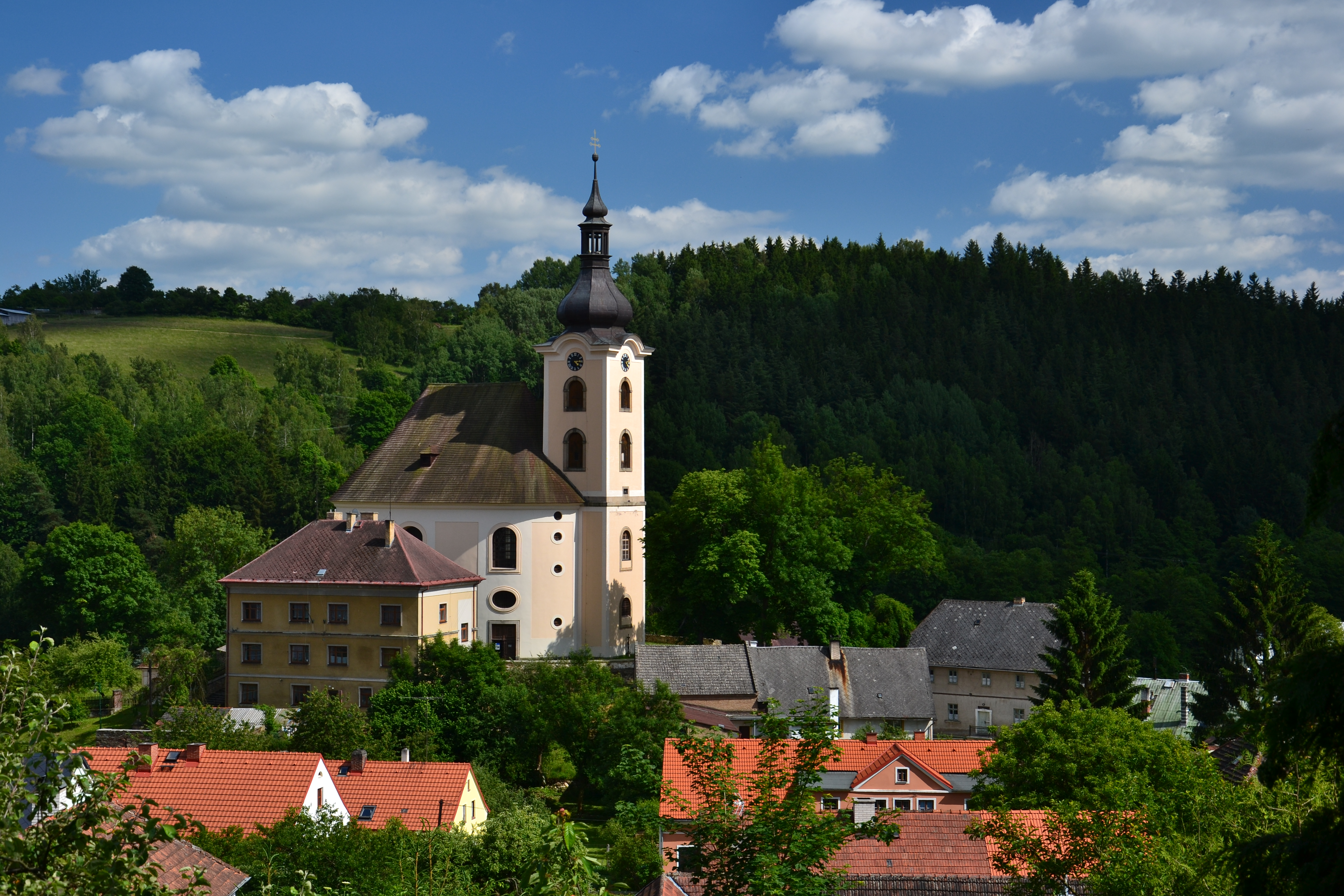
Church of the Nativity of Saint John the Baptist

The main landmark of the town centre is the Church of the Nativity of Saint John the Baptist. It was built in the Baroque style in 1695–1698 according to design of Christoph Dientzenhofer.

The Church of Saint Wenceslaus was built in 1747, probably by Kilian Ignaz Dientzenhofer.
