= Odolena Voda =

- Town
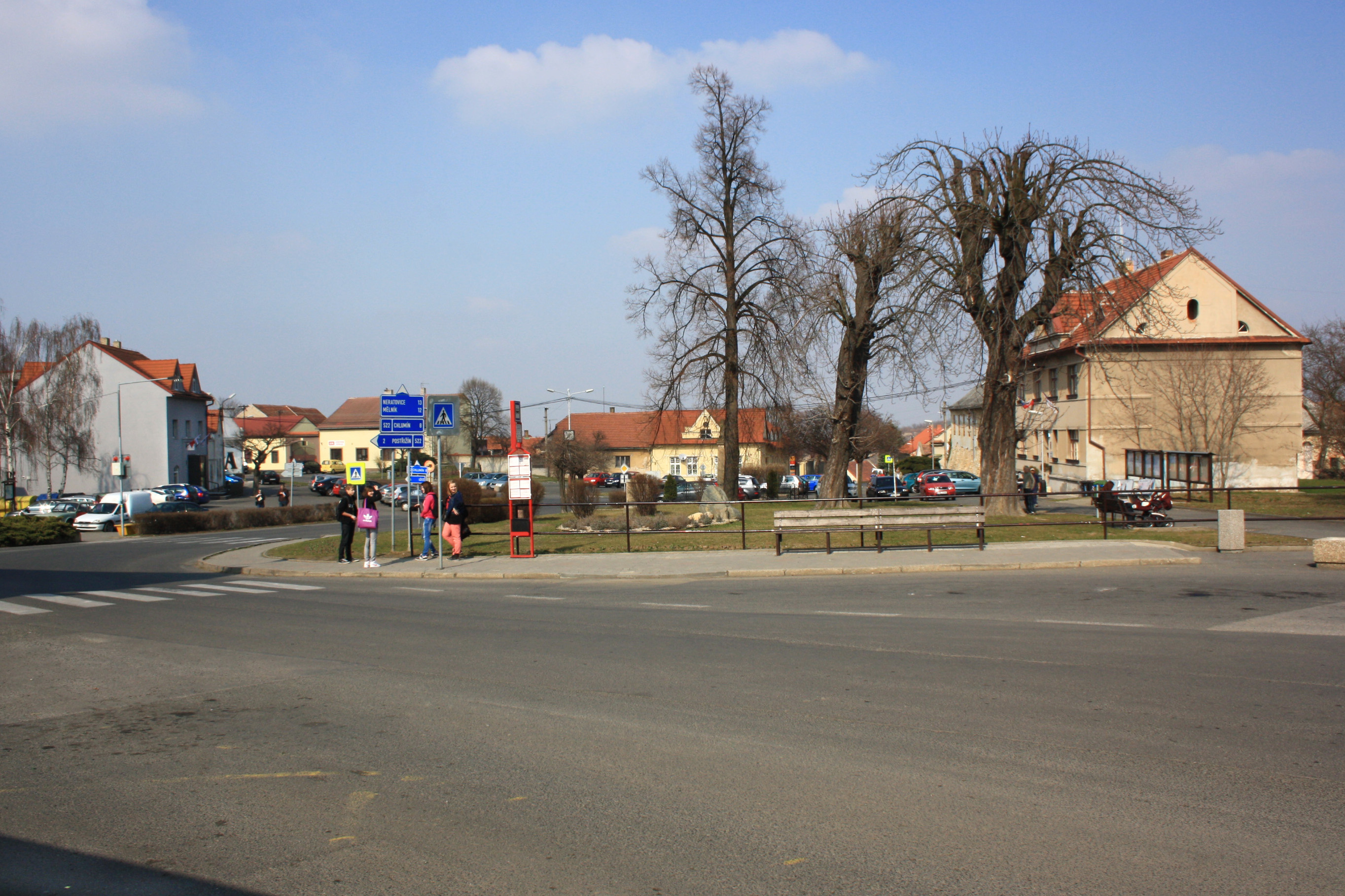
- The square Dolní náměstí

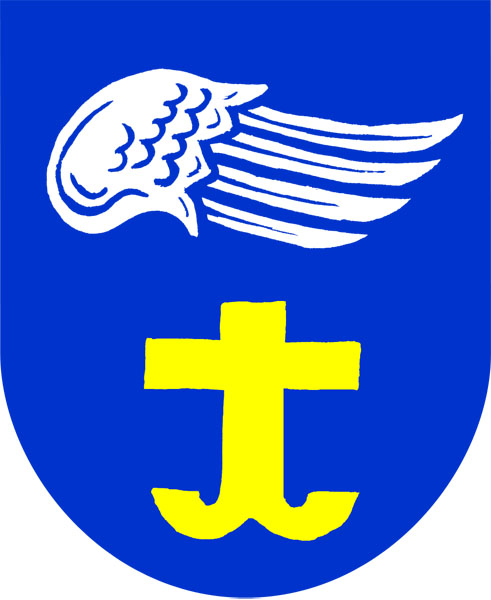
- Flag Coat of arms

- Location in the Czech Republic
- Coordinates: 50°13′55″N 14°24′39″E
- Country: Czech Republic
- Region: Central Bohemian
- District: Prague-East
- First mentioned: 1352

Government
  - Mayor: Ondřej Prášil

Area
  - Total: 11.24 km^{2} (4.34 sq mi)
- Elevation: 248 m (814 ft)

Population (2026-01-01)
  - Total: 6,639
  - Density: 590.7/km^{2} (1,530/sq mi)
- Time zone: UTC+1 (CET)
  - Summer (DST): UTC+2 (CEST)
- Postal code: 250 70
- Website: www.odolenavoda.cz

Odolena Voda (Czech pronunciation: [ˈodolɛna ˈvoda]) is a town in Prague-East District in the Central Bohemian Region of the Czech Republic. It has about 6,600 inhabitants. The town is located on the border between the Prague Plateau and Central Elbe Table. It is known for the company Aero Vodochody, which is the biggest aircraft manufacturer in the Czech Republic.

Odolena Voda was founded in the 14th century at the latest, but it became a town only in 1998. The most important monument is the Church of Saint Clement.

== Administrative division ==
Odolena Voda consists of two municipal parts (in brackets population according to the 2021 census):

- Odolena Voda (5,204)
- Dolínek (1,045)

== Etymology ==
The name means "Odolen's water" in Czech. The settlement was named after Knight Odolen of Střížovice and refers to the sufficient water in the area in earlier times.

== Geography ==
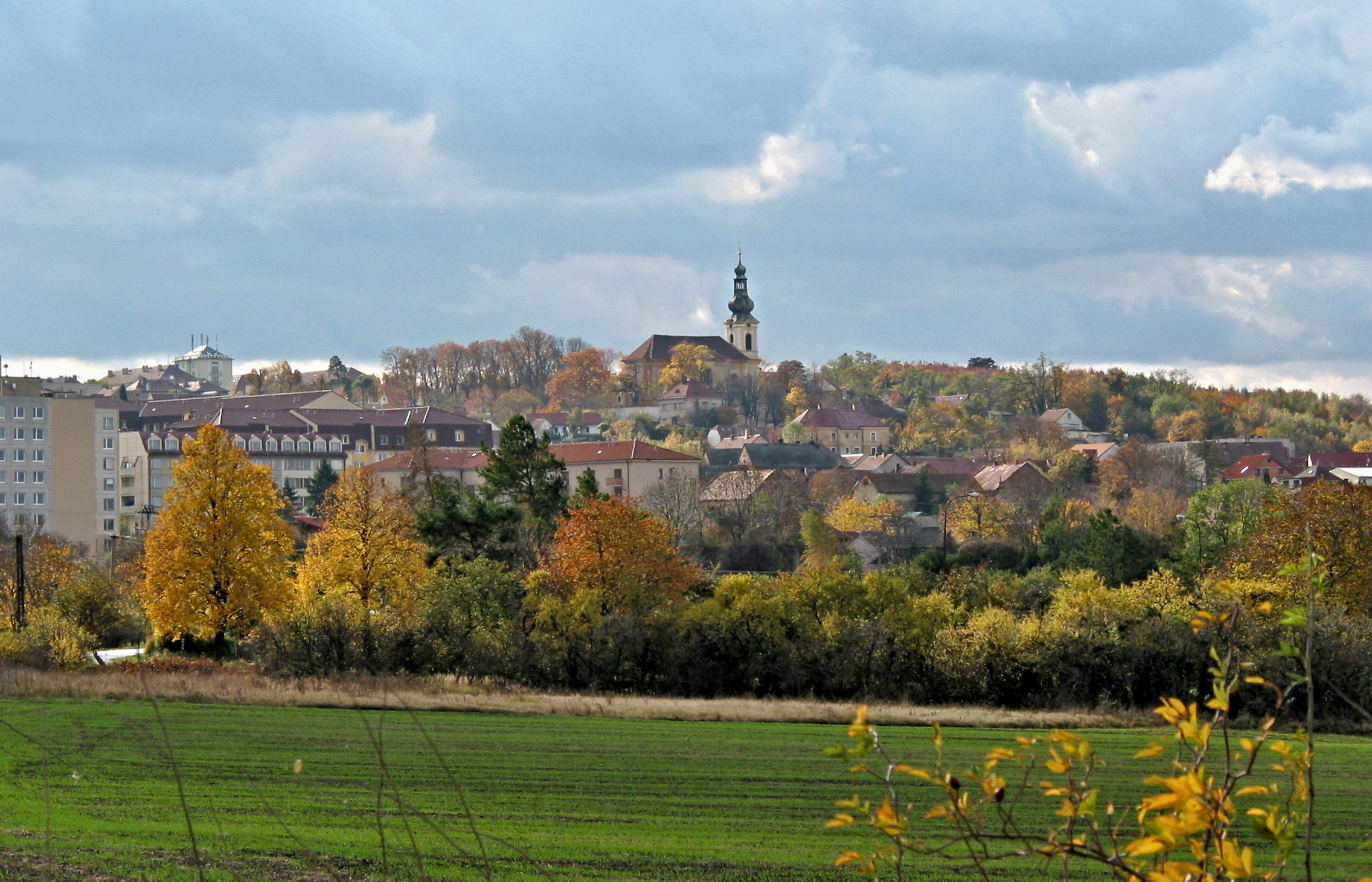
View from the north

Odolena Voda is located about 11 kilometres (7 mi) north of Prague. It lies on the border between the Prague Plateau and Central Elbe Table. The stream Korycanský potok originates in the centre of the town. A small nameless fishpond is built on the stream's spring, and a system of three other fishponds is built on the stream in the eastern part of the town.

== History ==
The first written mention of Odolena Voda is from 1352. Until the Hussite Wars, the village was owned by the Metropolitan Chapter at Saint Vitus in Prague, then it was a property of the Old Town of Prague. In 1547, the properties of the Old Town were confiscated and Odolena Voda was acquired by the Sekerka of Sedčice noble family. However, their properties were confiscated as a result of the Battle of White Mountain. In 1623, Odolena Voda was bought by the Lobkowicz family. From 1671, the village was owned by the Jesuits.

From 1844 to the beginning of the 20th century, there was a sugar factory. In 1953, the aircraft factory was founded, which triggered the growth of the municipality and the influx of residents. In 1998, Odolena Voda was promoted to a town.

== Demographics ==
Historical population

Year	Pop.	±%
1869	1,214	—
1880	1,605	+32.2%
1890	1,574	−1.9%
1900	1,583	+0.6%
1910	1,442	−8.9%

Year	Pop.	±%
1921	1,269	−12.0%
1930	1,170	−7.8%
1950	1,098	−6.2%
1961	1,986	+80.9%
1970	3,242	+63.2%

Year	Pop.	±%
1980	4,063	+25.3%
1991	4,226	+4.0%
2001	4,344	+2.8%
2011	5,651	+30.1%
2021	6,249	+10.6%

Source: Censuses

== Economy ==
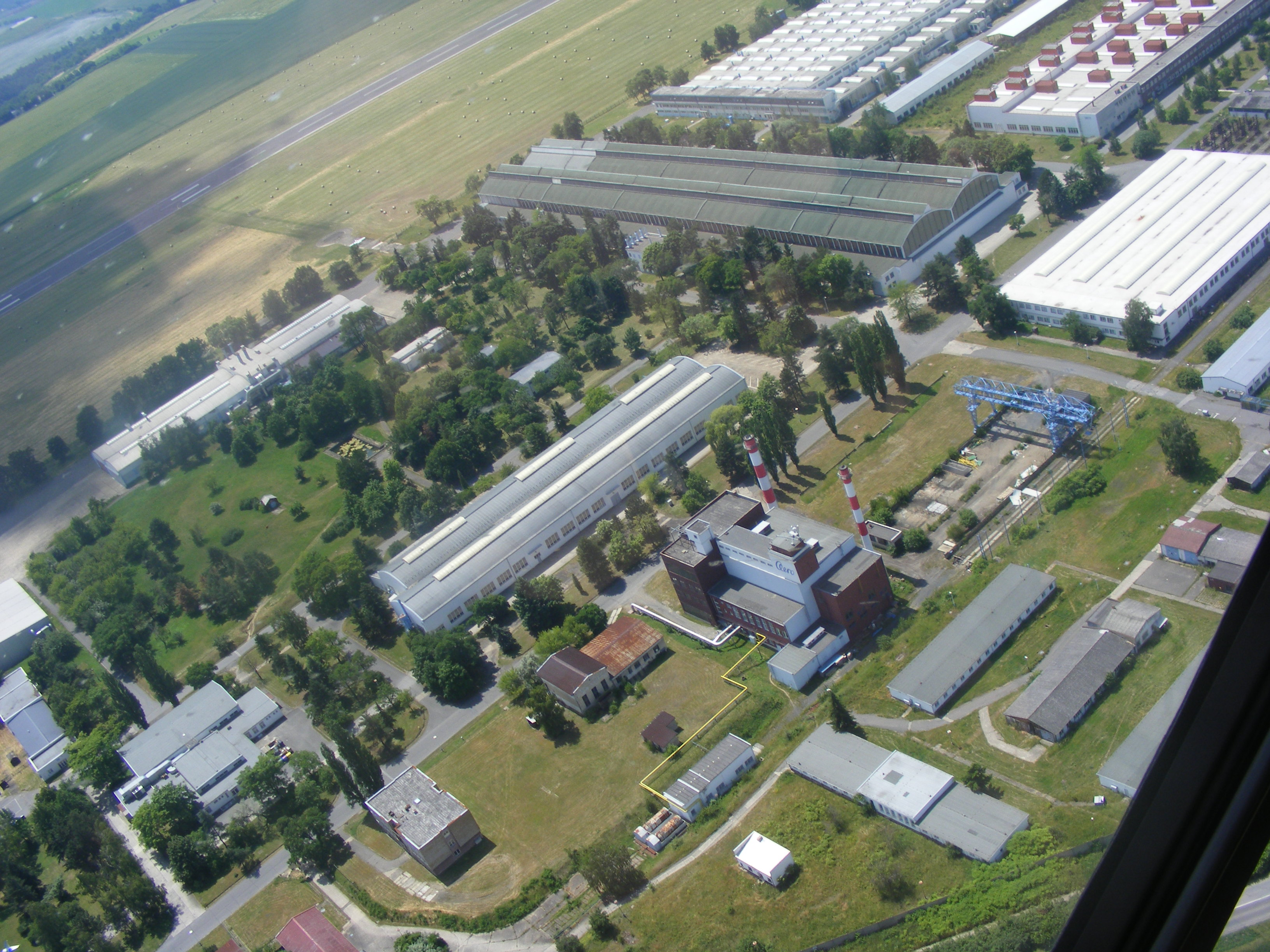
Aero Vodochody factory

The biggest aircraft manufacturer in the Czech Republic, Aero Vodochody, is based in the town. It employs more than 1,500 people.

In the territory of Odolena Voda is the Čenkov Quarry where stone is mined. It is operated by the company Colas CZ.

== Transport ==
The D8 motorway from Prague to Ústí nad Labem runs next to the town.

== Sights ==
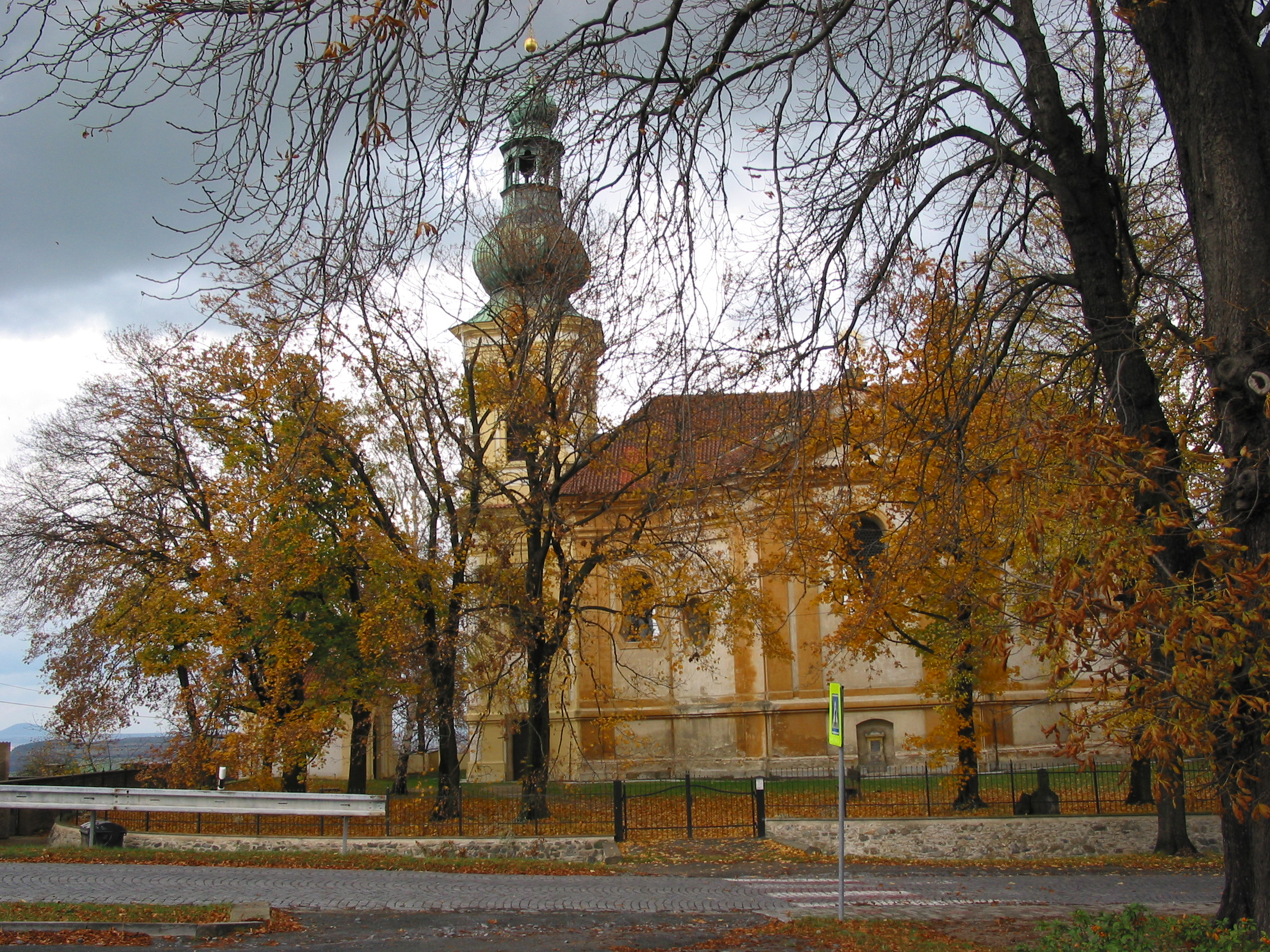
Church of Saint Clement

The main historical landmark of Odolena Voda is the Church of Saint Clement. It was built by the architect Kilian Ignaz Dientzenhofer in the Baroque style in 1733–1735.

== Notable people ==
- Vítězslav Hálek (1835–1874), poet, writer and journalist
- Stanislav Huml (1955–2021), politician
