= St. Nicholas Church (Malá Strana) =

Church in Prague, Czech Republic

St Nicholas Church
- The Church of Saint Nicholas
- Kostel svatého Mikuláše
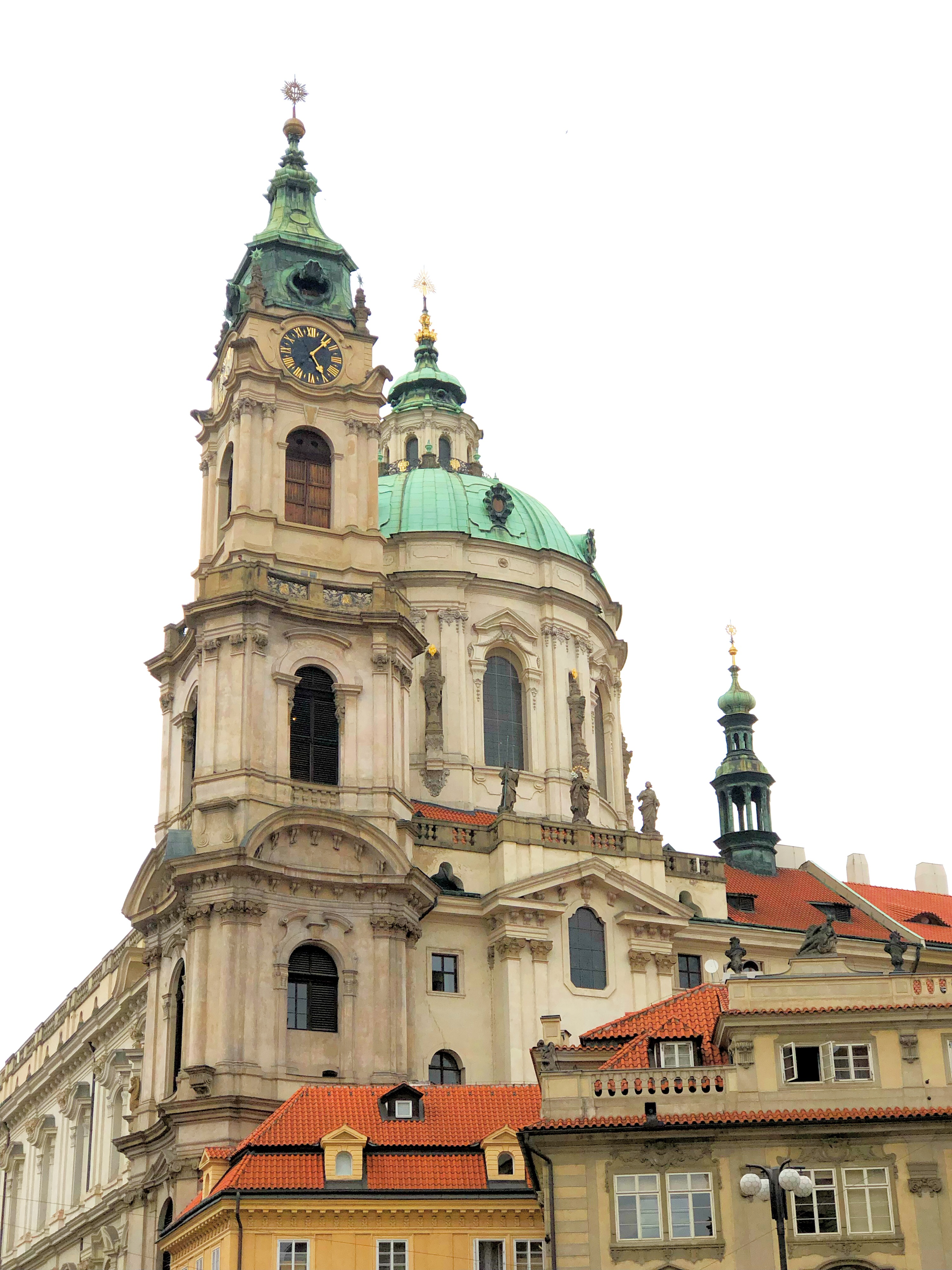
- St Nicholas Church
- 50°05′17″N 14°24′12″E
- Location: Prague
- Country: Czech Republic
- Denomination: Roman Catholic
- Website: Website of the Church

History
- Status: Active
- Founded: 1704

Architecture
- Functional status: Parish Church
- Architect: Christoph Dientzenhofer
- Architectural type: Basilica
- Style: Baroque
- Completed: 1755

Specifications
- Height: 49 m (161 ft)

Administration
- Archdiocese: Prague
- Parish: Lesser Town of Prague

The Church of Saint Nicholas (Czech: Kostel svatého Mikuláše) is a Baroque church in the Lesser Town of Prague. It was built between 1704 and 1755 on the site where formerly a Gothic church from the 13th century stood, which was also dedicated to Saint Nicholas. It has been described as the greatest example of Prague Baroque.

== History ==
The original Gothic parish church of Saint Nicholas which dated from the 13th century, stood on the site of the present church. Sometime after 1620, it was given to the Jesuits, and the parish transferred to St. Václav's Church. In 1628, they opened a primary school and a junior secondary school.

In the second half of the 17th century the Jesuits decided to build a new church designed by Giovanni Domenico Orsi. A partial impression of the original planned appearance of the church is provided by the Chapel of St Barbara, which was built first so that mass could be celebrated. Old Saint Nicholas was demolished and in 1673 the cornerstone laid for the new church. The church was built in two stages during the 18th century. From 1703 till 1711 the west façade, the choir, the Chapels of St Barbara and St Anne were built.

Count Wenceslaus Kolowrat-Liebsteinsky (1634 – 6 October 1659) from the prominent Czech House of Kolowrat was the largest patron of the Church of St. Nicholas. He donated his entire estate to the construction of the church and adjacent buildings in Malá Strana.

The new plans involved an intricate geometrical system of interconnected cylinders with a central dome above the transept. The massive nave with side chapels and an undulating vault based on a system of intersecting ellipsoids was apparently built by Christoph Dientzenhofer. The pillars between the wide spans of the arcade supporting the triforium were meant to maximize the dynamic effect of the church. The chancel and its characteristic copper cupola were built in 1737–1752, this time using plans by Christoph's son, Kilian Ignaz Dientzenhofer.

In 1752, after Dientzenhofer's death in 1751, the construction of the church tower was completed. During the years the church continued to expand its interior beauty. Following the abolition of the Jesuit Order by Pope Clement XIV, St Nicholas became the main parish church of the Lesser Town in 1775.

During the Communist era the church tower was used as an observatory for State Security since from the tower it was possible to keep watch on the American and Yugoslav embassies and the access route to the West German embassy.

== Decoration ==
It has been described as "the most impressive example of Prague Baroque" and "without doubt the greatest Baroque church in Prague and the Dientzenhofers' supreme achievement".

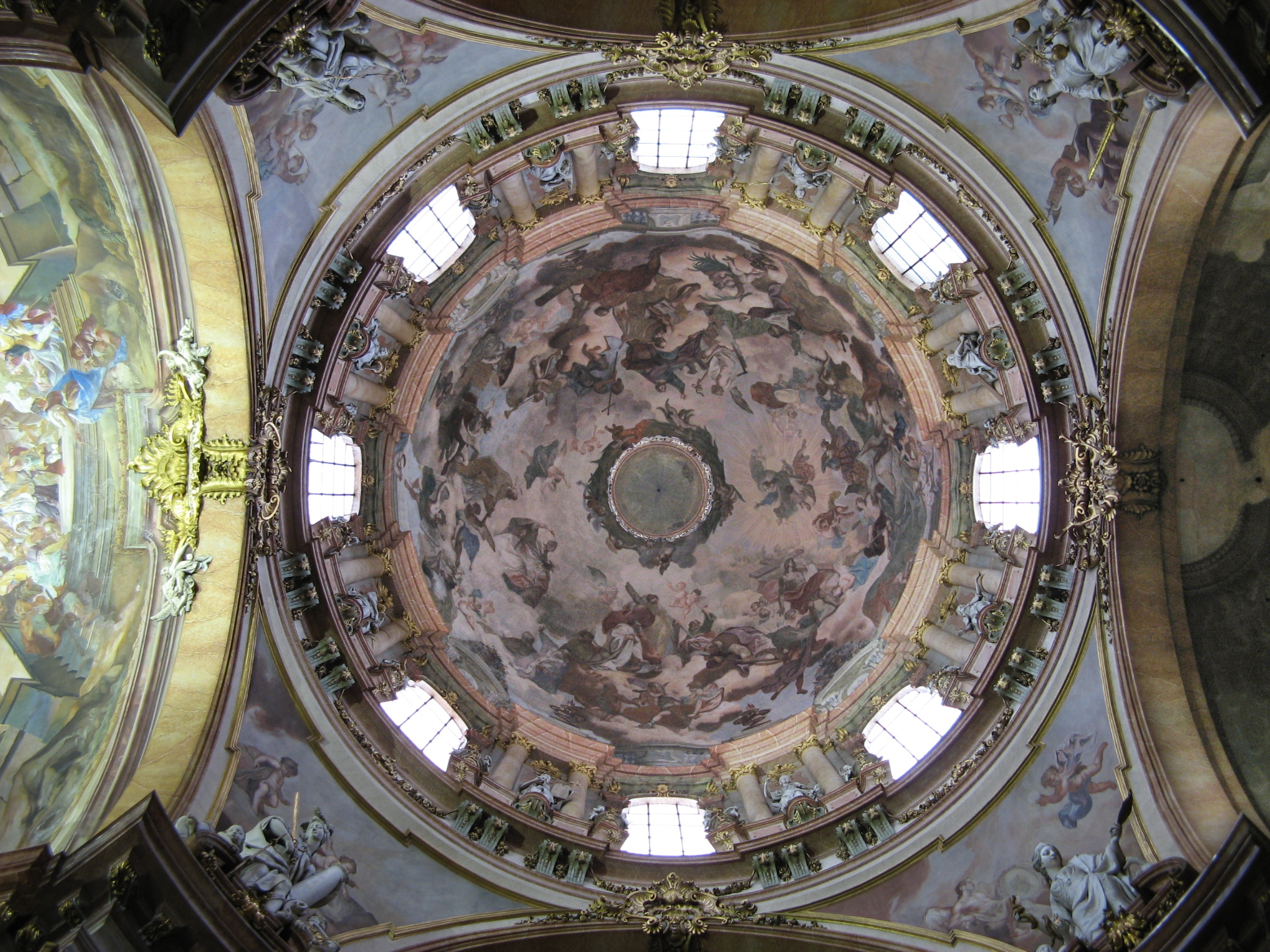
Interior of the dome

On the shield is a sign of the alleged patron of the building Frantisek Karel Count of Kolowrat-Liebsteinsky. The mark of the actual patron Václav Count of Kolowrat-Liebsteinsky on the facade of the temple is not found. He was so humble that he did not want his name to be associated with the building, and after the completion of the building the coat of arms of his uncle were used.

The church excels not only in the architecture, but also in the decoration, external facade is brownish color, mainly with the frescos by Jan Lukas Kracker and a fresco inside the 70 m high dome by František Xaver Palko. The interior is further decorated with sculptures by František Ignác Platzer.

The Baroque organ has over 4,000 pipes up to six metres in length and was played by Mozart in 1787. Mozart's spectacular masterpiece, Mass in C, was first performed in the Church of Saint Nicholas shortly after his visit.

The 79 m tall belfry is directly connected with the church's massive dome. The belfry with great panoramic view, was unlike the church completed in Rococo forms in 1751–1756 by Anselmo Lurago.

== Present day ==
The church is filial church of the Malá Strana parish, a weekly mass is celebrated every Sunday at 8.30pm. Organ and church music concerts are held daily April to October.

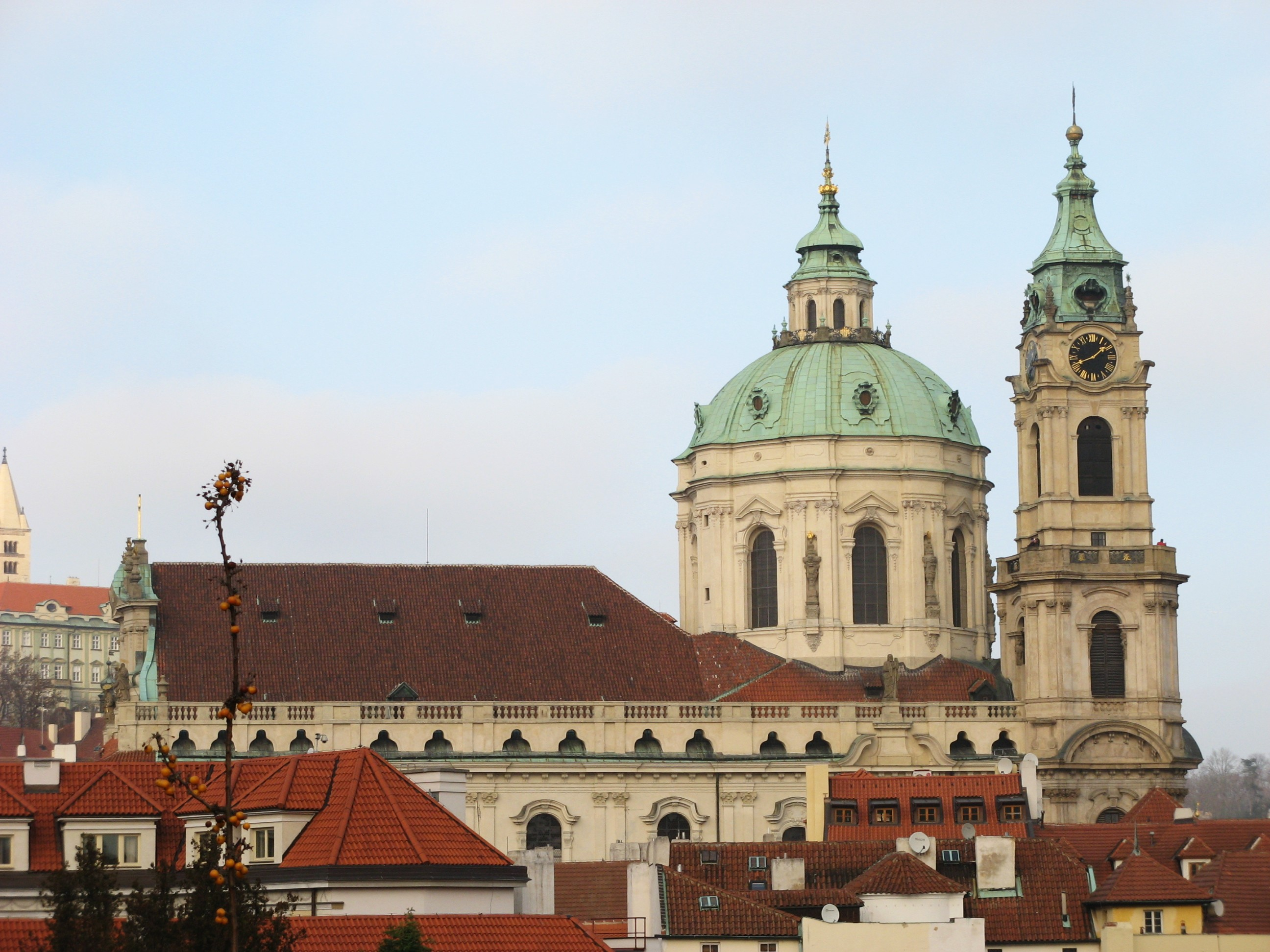
Panoramic view taken from Petřín

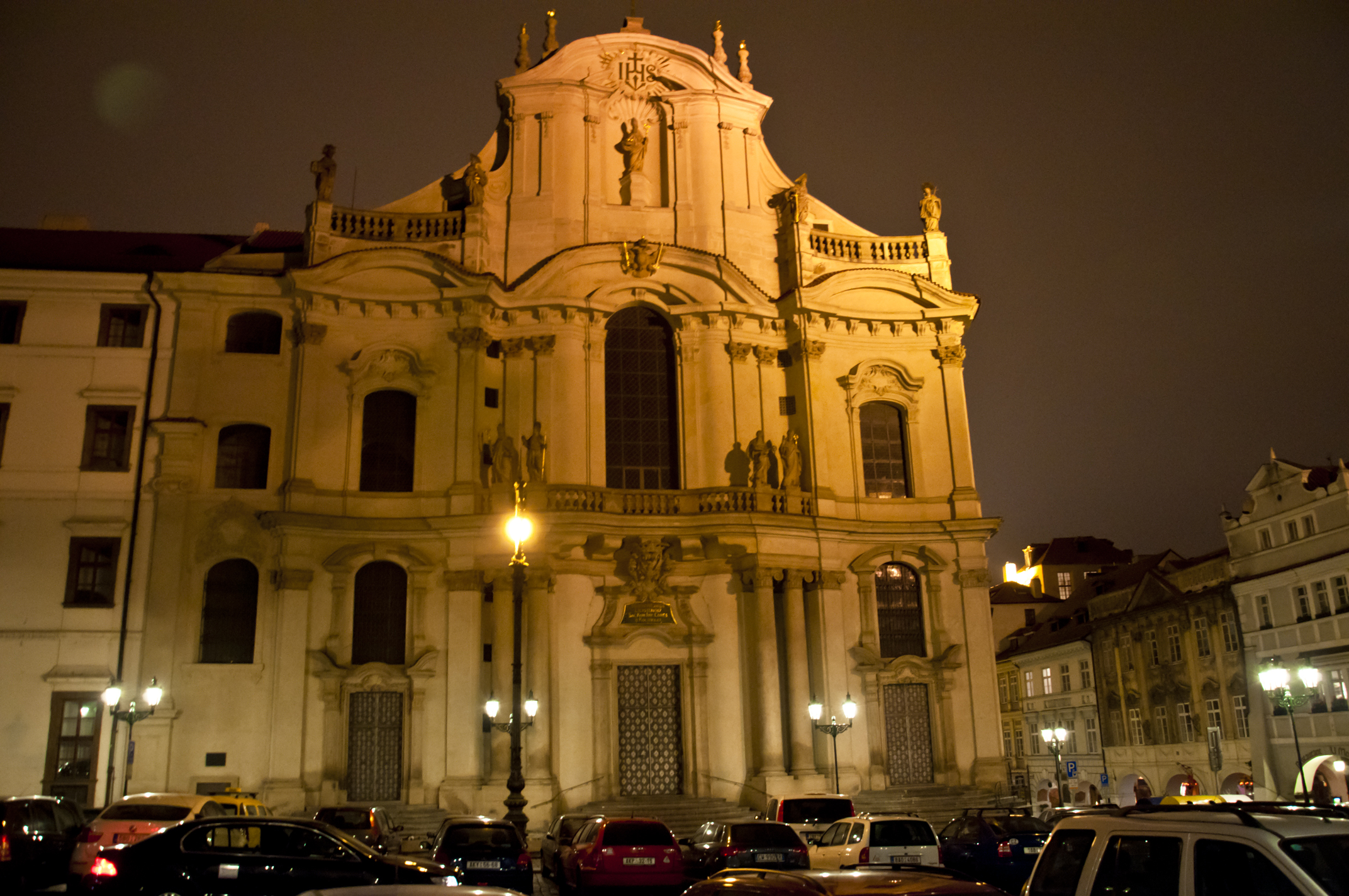
Front entrance

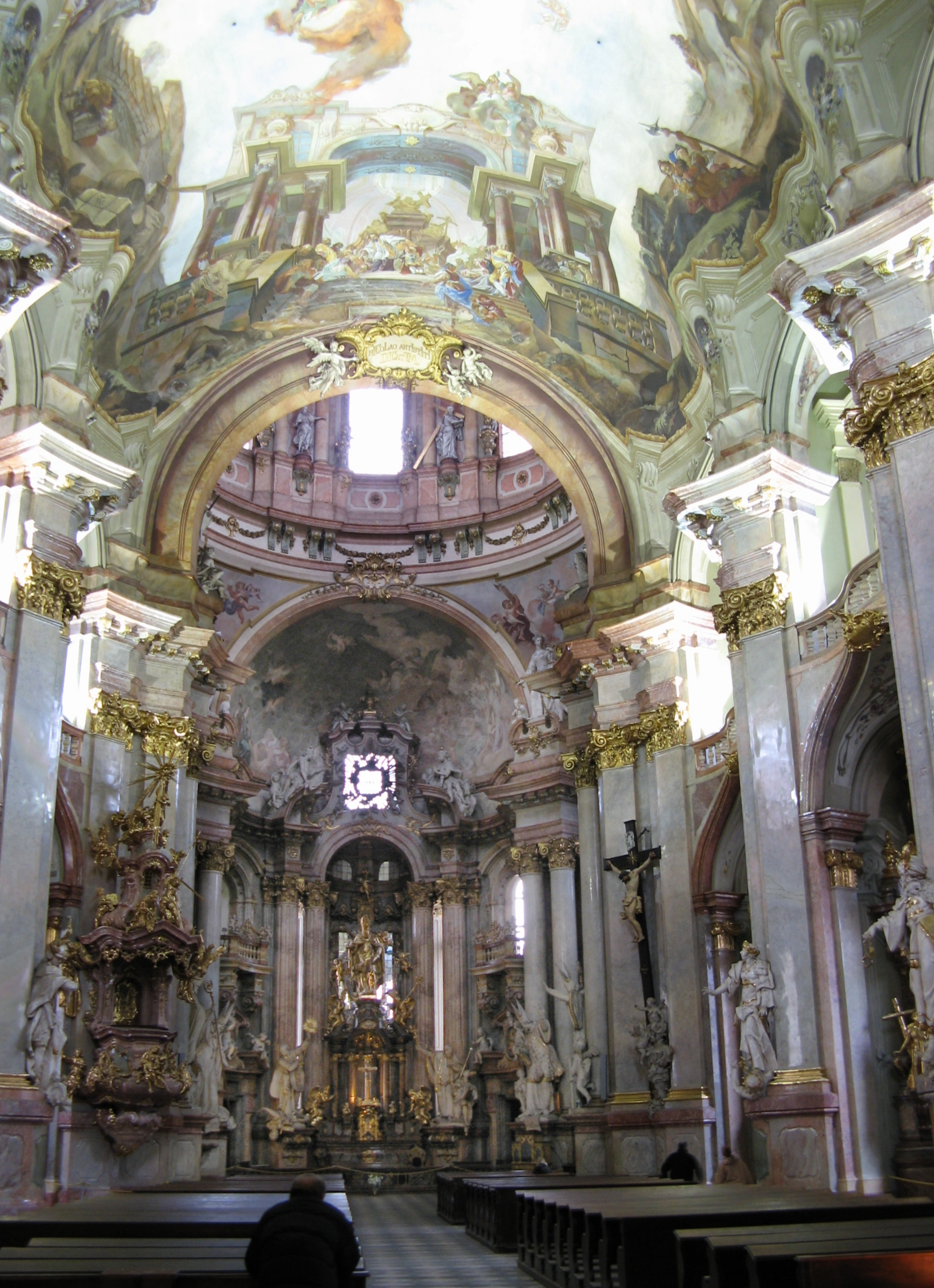
Interior of the church

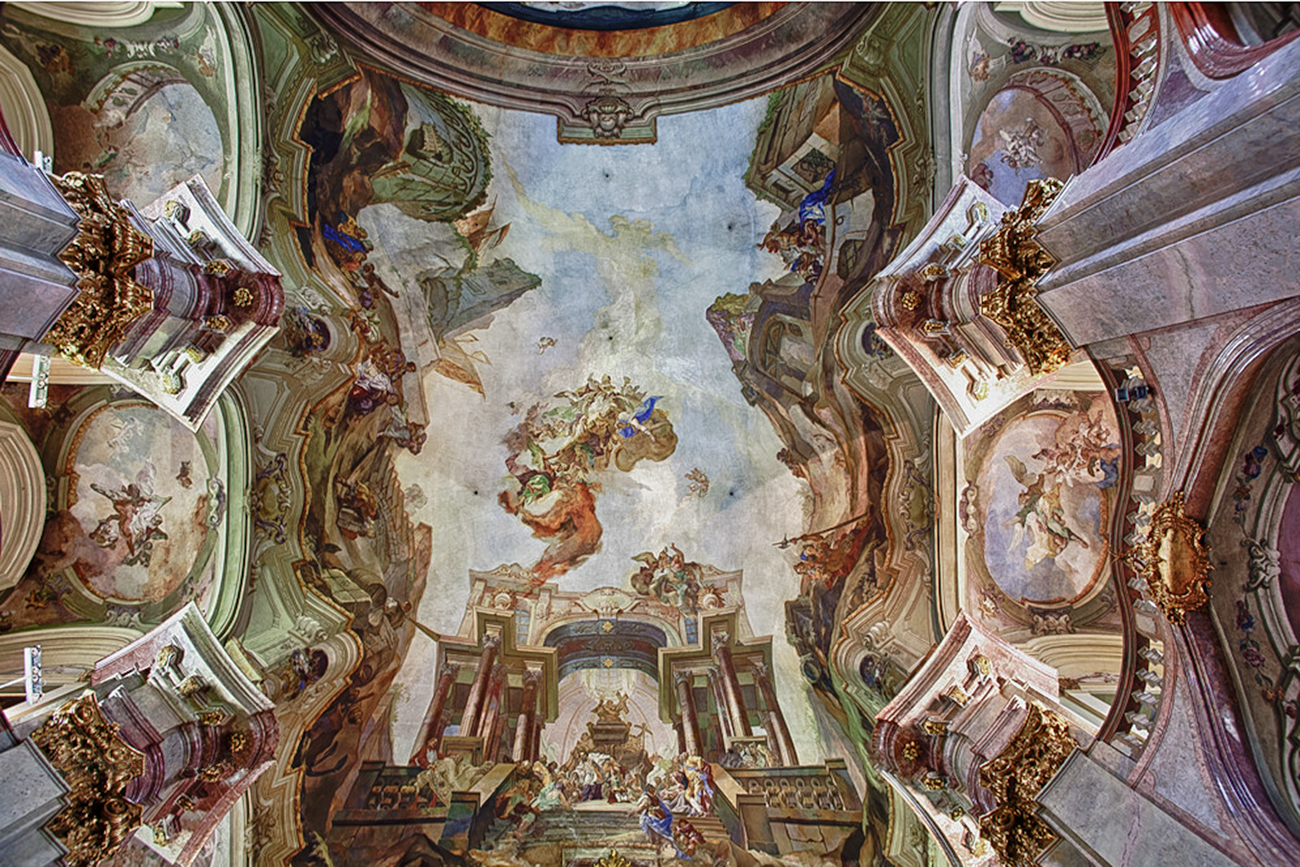
Ceiling fresco depicting the Apotheosis of St. Nicholas

== See also ==
- List of Jesuit sites
