= Loreta (Prague) =

Church in Hradčany, Czech Republic

Coordinates: 50°05′22″N 14°23′31″E

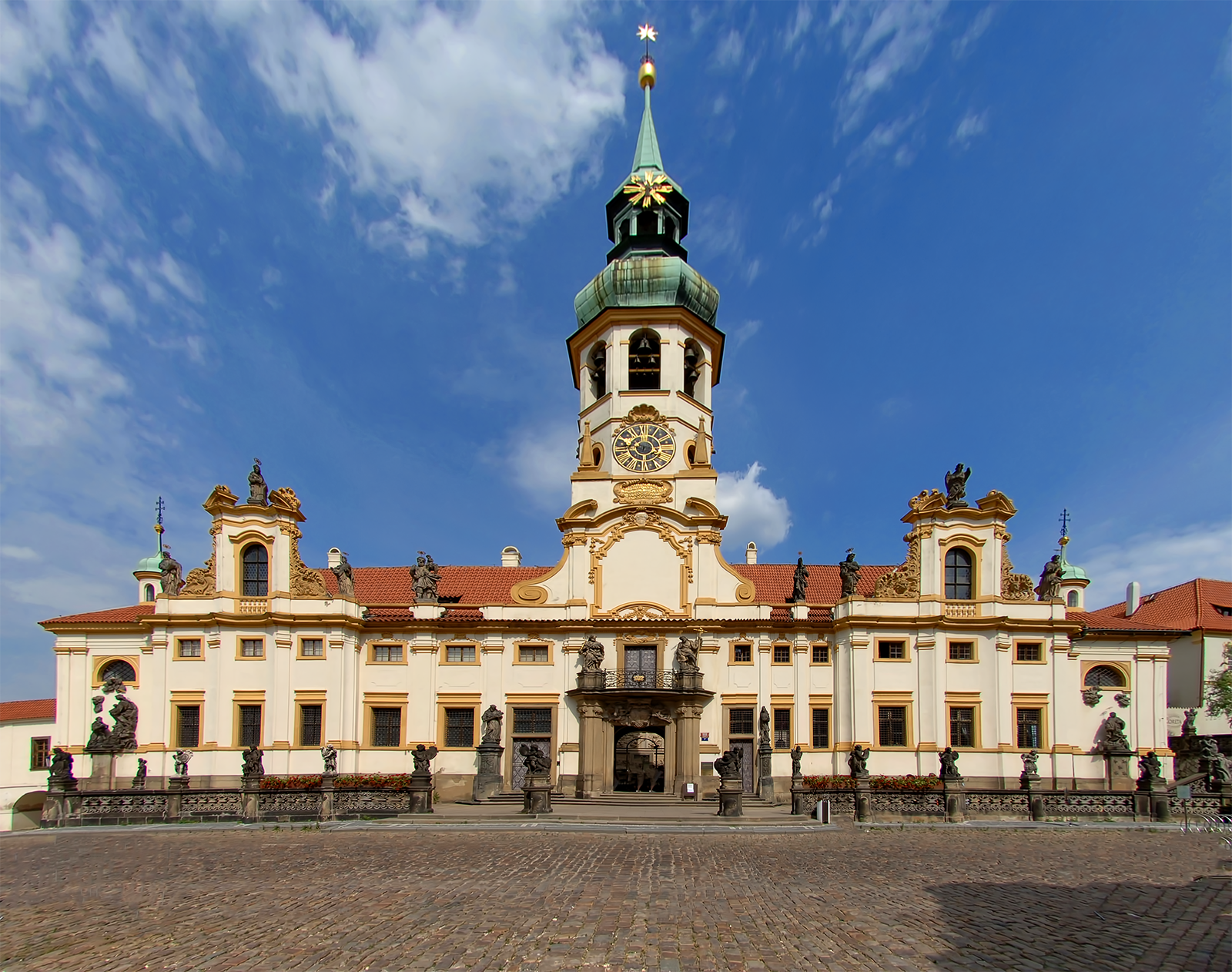
Loreta Monastery Exterior View. Photo by Richard Finkelstein

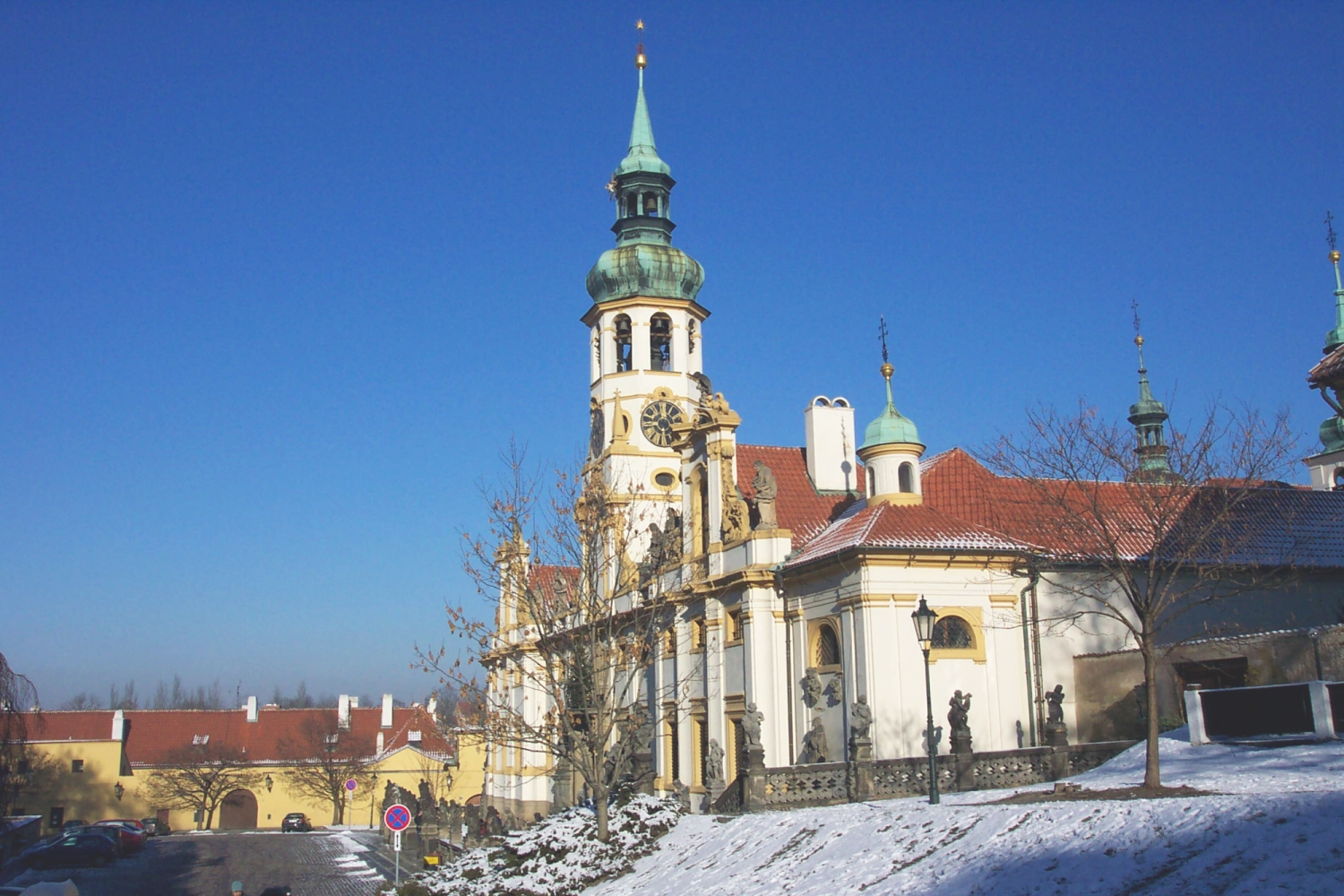
Loreta from Loreta Square

Loreta is a pilgrimage destination in Hradčany, a district of Prague, Czech Republic. It consists of a cloister, the church of the Lord's Birth, the Santa Casa and a clock tower with a famous chime.

Construction started in 1626 and the Holy Hut was blessed on 25 March 1631. The architect was the Italian Giovanni Orsi, and the project was financed by Kateřina Benigna, a noblewoman of the Lobkowicz family. Fifty years later the place of pilgrimage was surrounded by cloisters, to which an upper storey was added after 1740 by Kilián Ignác Dientzenhofer. The baroque facade was designed by the architects Christoph Dientzenhofer and Kilian Ignaz Dientzenhofer, and added at the beginning of the 18th century.

The chapel is most known for its peal, heard since 15 August 1695. It was constructed during 1694 by watchmaker Peter Neumann from thirty smaller and larger bells.

Today the building also houses a large collection of liturgical tools, mainly monstrances. Exhibitions are occasionally held on the first floor of the cloister.

Neighbouring Loreta Square (Czech: Loretánské náměstí) is named after Loreta.

== See also ==
- Loretan Church in Praga
- Basilica della Santa Casa
- Basilica of the Annunciation in Nazareth
