= Kilian Ignaz Dientzenhofer =

Czech architect

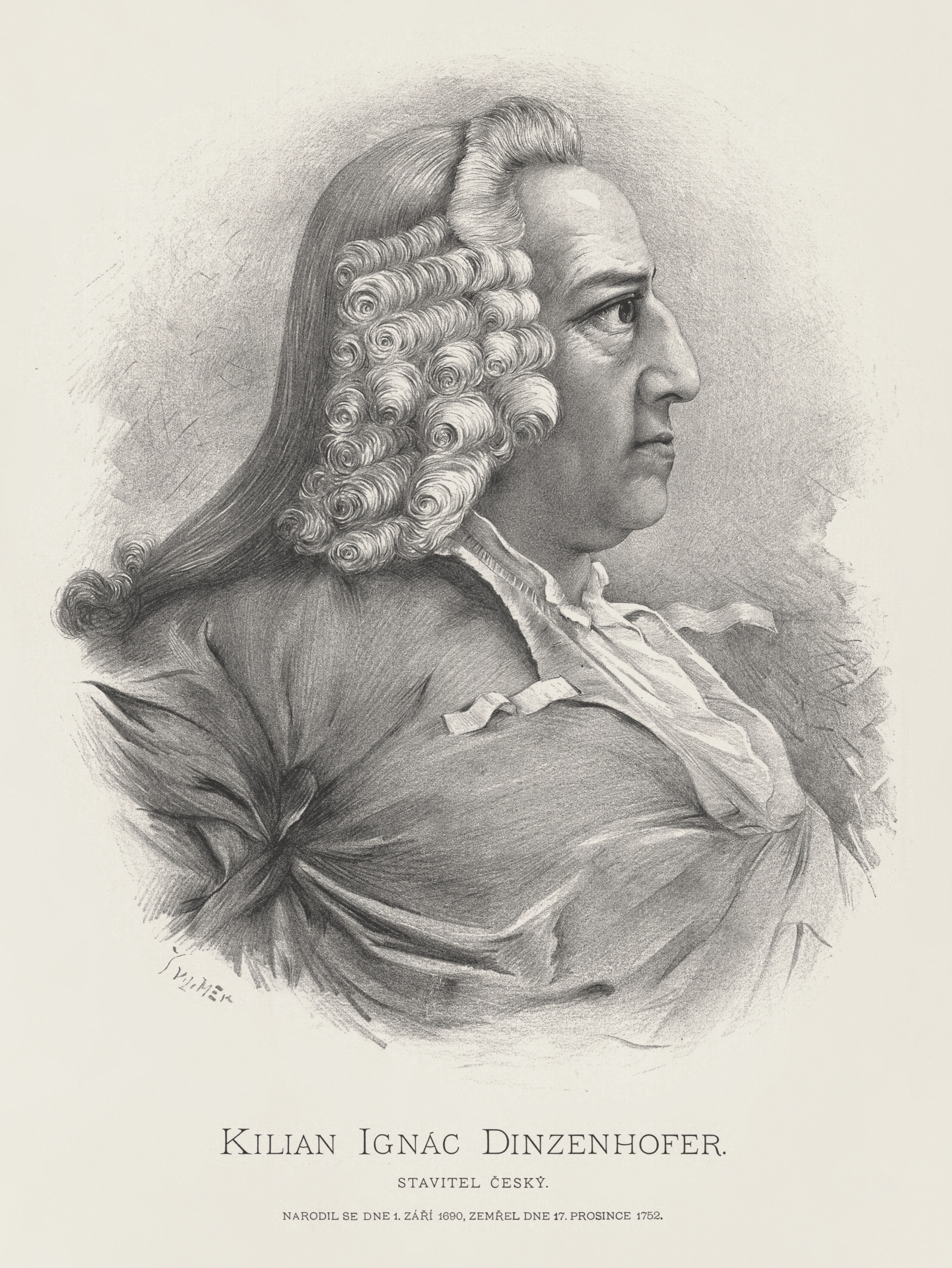
- Kilian Ignaz Dientzenhofer by Jan Vilímek
- Born: 1 September 1689; Prague, Kingdom of Bohemia
- Died: 18 December 1751 (aged 62); Prague, Kingdom of Bohemia
- Known for: Architecture
- Notable work: Church of St. Nicholas in Prague-Malá Strana, Kinský Palace in Prague, Rural churches around Broumov
- Movement: Baroque (High Baroque of Bohemia)

Kilian Ignaz Dientzenhofer (Czech: Kilián Ignác Dientzenhofer; 1 September 1689 – 18 December 1751) was a German Bohemian architect of the Baroque era. He is among the most prolific and renowned architects of his era in Bohemia. He was born into the well known Dientzenhofer family of architects and is considered its most talented and productive member.

== Life ==
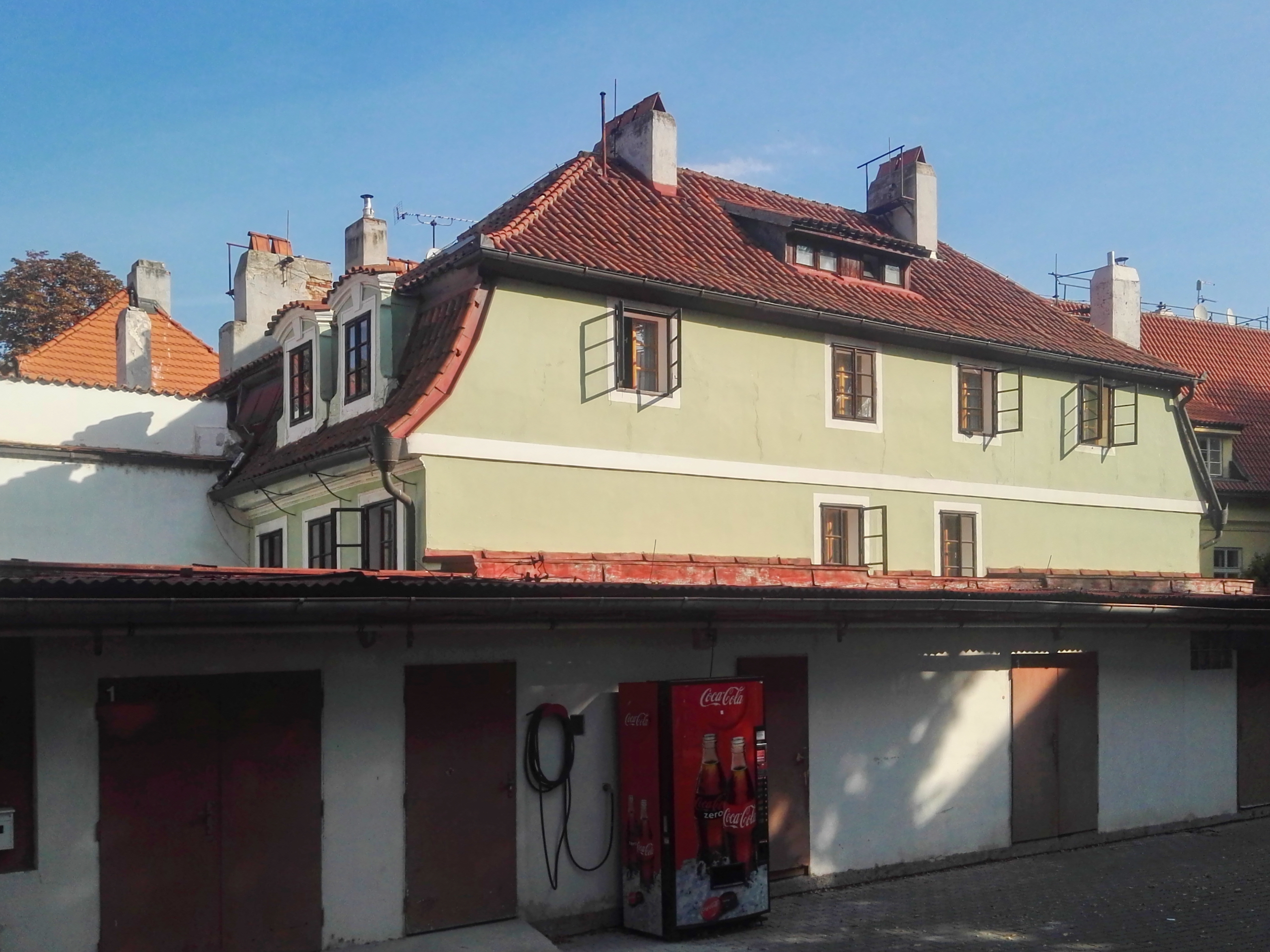
Aichbauerovský House in Prague-Malá Strana, the birthplace of Dientzenhofer

Kilian Ignaz Dientzenhofer was born on 1 September 1689 in Prague, Bohemia. He was the second son of the German architect Christoph Dientzenhofer and Maria Anna Aichbauer (née Lang), widow of the architect Johann Georg Aichbauer the Elder. He graduated from the Jesuit gymnasium in Prague-Malá Strana and in 1709 or 1710 he went abroad, where he got to know the architecture of Germany, France and Italy. He then worked as an apprentice in Vienna for the architect Johann Lukas von Hildebrandt. In 1716, he returned to Bohemia.

Dientzenhofer married twice; he had six children with Anna Cecília Popelová (1719–1729) and eleven children with Anna Terezia Hendrychová (1729–1751).

== Work ==
Kilian Ignaz was a member of the well known Dientzenhofer family of architects. He is considered the most talented and productive member of the family. During his life, he designed more than 200 buildings. He co-operated with his father and completed the constructions of another important architect, Jan Santini Aichel. He is one of the most important architects of the High Baroque era and his sacral buildings are considered the most beautiful in Bohemia.

Among famous Dientzenhofer's Prague buildings are e.g. the Church of Saint John of Nepomuk and Church of Saint Nicholas, as well as the Vila Amerika or the Kinský Palace. In addition, he built numerous churches and secular buildings in Bohemia proper, yet in one case also in Lower Silesia (Wahlstatt). Many of his later projects were realized by his pupil and son-in-law Anselmo Martino Lurago.

The opposite of Dientzenhofer's top work is the design of rural churches in northeastern Bohemia around the town of Broumov. They were supposed to be decorative and have sufficient capacity, but at the same time not too expensive. All the churches of this group (Broumov group of Baroque churches) – which also includes one pilgrim chapel by Dientzenhofer, three churches designed by his father, and one other church – are protected as national cultural monuments since 2022. Dientzenhofer also completely rebuilt the Benedictine monastery in Broumov, which is also a national cultural monument.

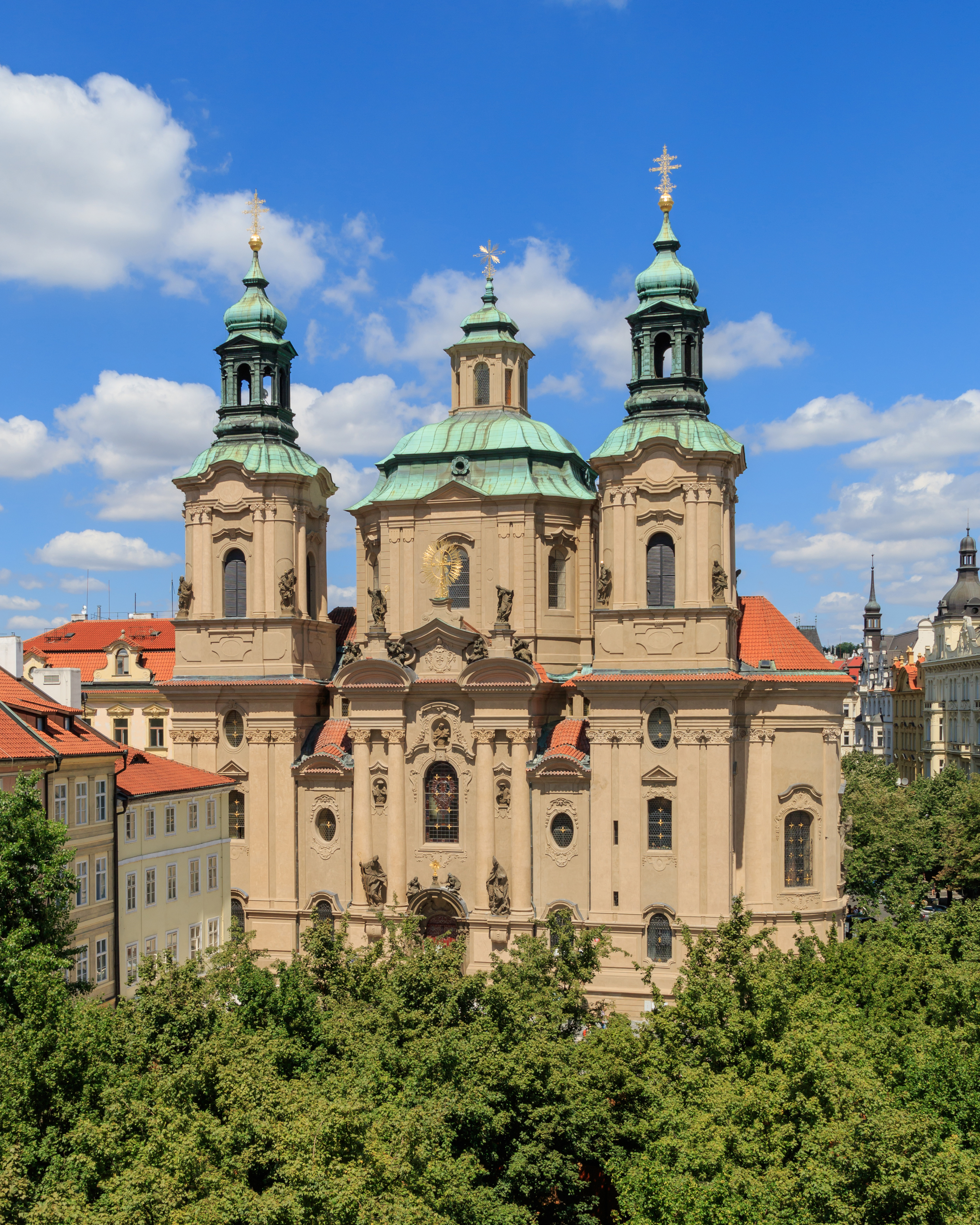
Church of St. Nicholas, Old Town Square, Prague

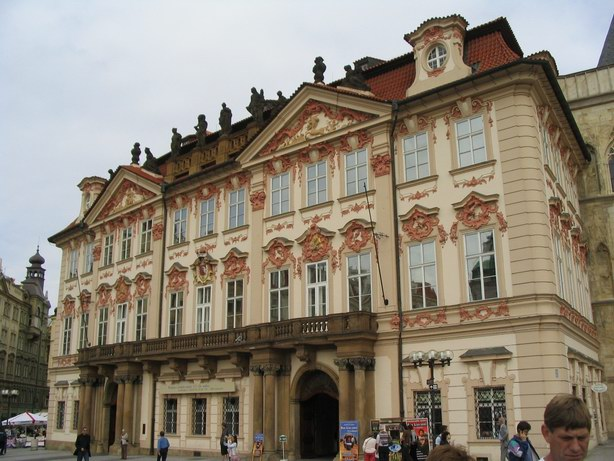
Kinský Palace Prague

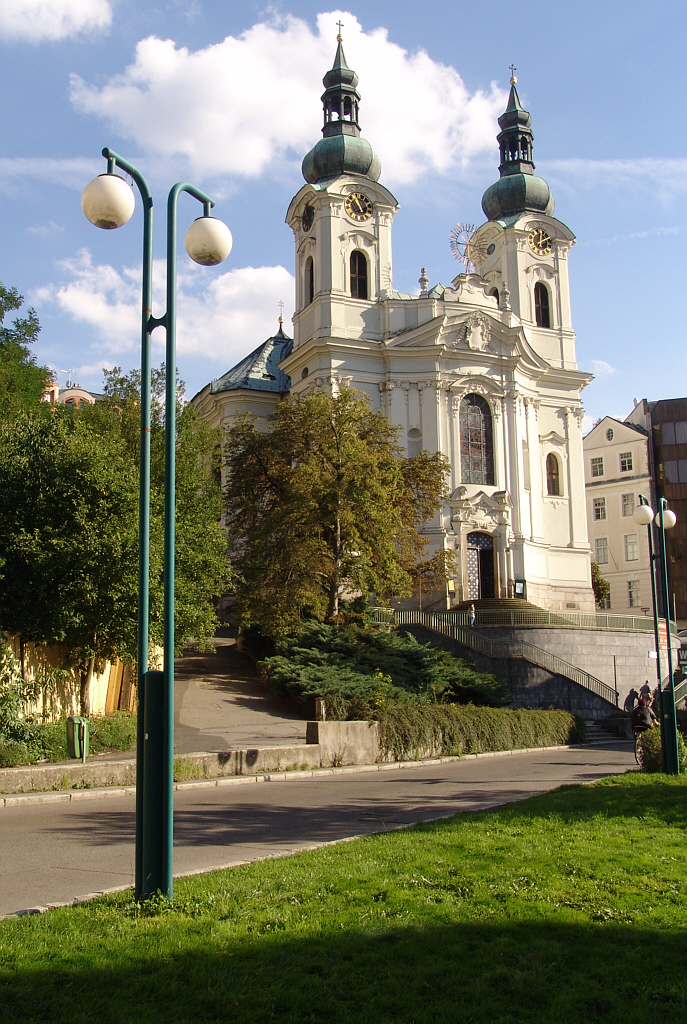
Church of St. Mary Magdalene, Karlovy Vary

=== Prague ===
- Vila Amerika in New Town (1717–1720), nowadays Antonín Dvořák museum
- Convent of Benedictine Břevnov Monastery (about 1717)
- St. John of Nepomuk Church in Hradčany (1720–1728)
- Redesign of Loreta in Hradčany (1723)
- Baroque redesign of Church of St. Thomas in Malá Strana (1725–1731)
- Villa Portheimka in Smíchov (1725)
- Reconstruction of the House at Two Turtle Doves in Malá Strana (1726)
- Church of St. John of Nepomuk, New Town (1730–1738)
- St. Bartholomew church in the Old Town (1731)
- St. Nicholas Church on Old Town Square (1732–1735)
- Cathedral of Saints Cyril and Methodius in New Town (1730–1736)
- Completion of St. Nicholas Church in Malá Strana (1737–1751)
- Goltz-Kinsky Palace on Old Town Square (1755–1765)
- Sylva-Taroucca Palace in New Town (probably; 1743–1751)

=== Eastern Bohemia ===
- Town hall in Police nad Metují (probably; 1718)
- Church of All Saints in Heřmánkovice (1722–1726)
- Church of St. Margaret the Virgin in Šonov (1724–1726)
- Church of St. Procopius in Bezděkov nad Metují (1724–1727)
- Church of St. Anne in Vižňov (1724–1727)
- Benedictine monastery in Broumov (1727–1735)
- Church of St. Wenceslaus in Broumov (1728–1729)
- Chapel of Our Lady of the Snows in Hlavňov (1732–1733)
- Church of St. Mary Magdalene in Božanov (1735–1740)
- Church of the Nativity of the Virgin Mary in Hořice (1738–1748)
- Sloupno Castle (1748)
- Meziměstí Castle (1750)

=== Other places ===
- Church of the Nativity of the Virgin Mary in Plánice (1717–1726)
- St. Jadwiga's Basilica, Legnickie Pole (1719–1733)
- Ploskovice Chateau (probably; 1720–1730)
- Church of St. Adalbert in Počaply (1724–1726)
- Church of St. Mary Magdalene in Karlovy Vary (1729–1730)
- Church of St. Clement in Odolena Voda (1733–1735)
- Chapel of Blessed Podiven in Stará Boleslav (1738)
- Cistercian monastery in Plasy (1739)
- Church of St. Wenceslaus in Úterý (1747)
- Church of the Assumption of the Virgin Mary in Přeštice (1750–1775)
