= Stanislav Huml =

Czech police officer and politician (1955–2021)

Stanislav Huml MP
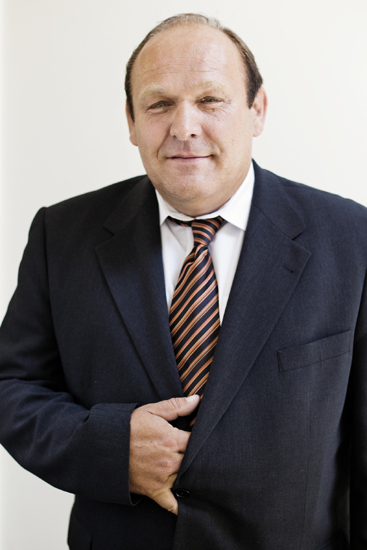
- Huml in 2010

Member of the Chamber of Deputies
- In office 16 May 2011 – 28 December 2021

Personal details
- Born: 30 July 1955 Odolena Voda, Czechoslovakia (now Czech Republic)
- Died: 28 December 2021 (aged 66)
- Children: 5
- Website: www.humlstanislav.cz

Stanislav Huml (30 July 1955 – 28 December 2021) was a Czech police officer and politician who served as a member of the Chamber of Deputies of the Czech Republic from 2011 until his death in 2021. He supported a number of conspiracy theories. He died on 28 December 2021 from COVID-19, at the age of 66.
