= Legnickie Pole =

- Village
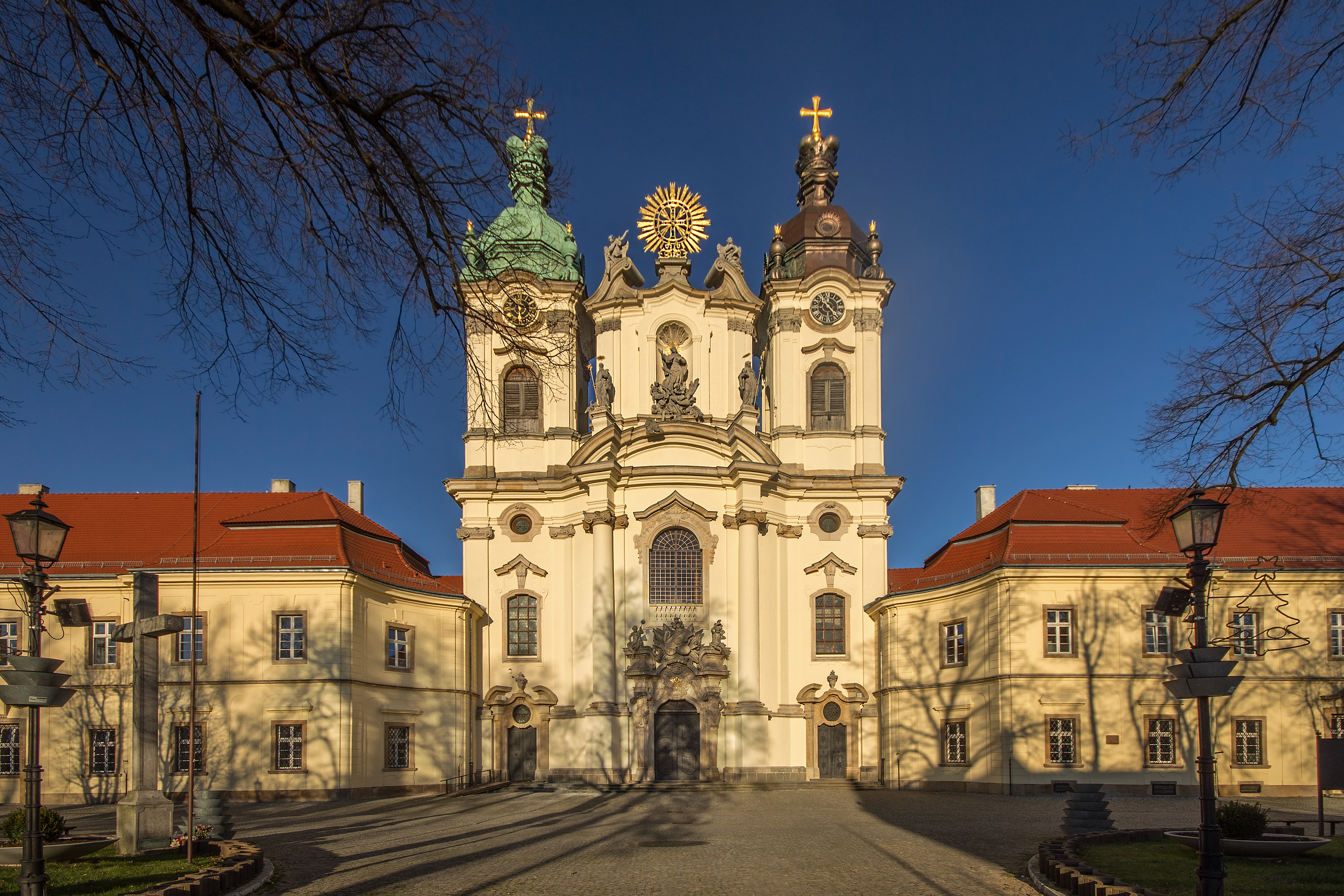
- Baroque St. Jadwiga's Basilica

- Flag Coat of arms

- Location within Poland
- Coordinates: 51°09′N 16°15′E
- Country: Poland
- Voivodeship: Lower Silesian
- County: Legnica
- Gmina: Legnickie Pole

Population
  - Total: 780
- Time zone: UTC+1 (CET)
  - Summer (DST): UTC+2 (CEST)
- Vehicle registration: DLE

Legnickie Pole [lɛɡˈnit͡skʲɛ ˈpɔlɛ] (German: Wahlstatt)(in 1945–1948 Dobre Pole) is a village in Legnica County, Lower Silesian Voivodeship, in south-western Poland. It is the seat of the administrative district (gmina) called Gmina Legnickie Pole.

== History ==
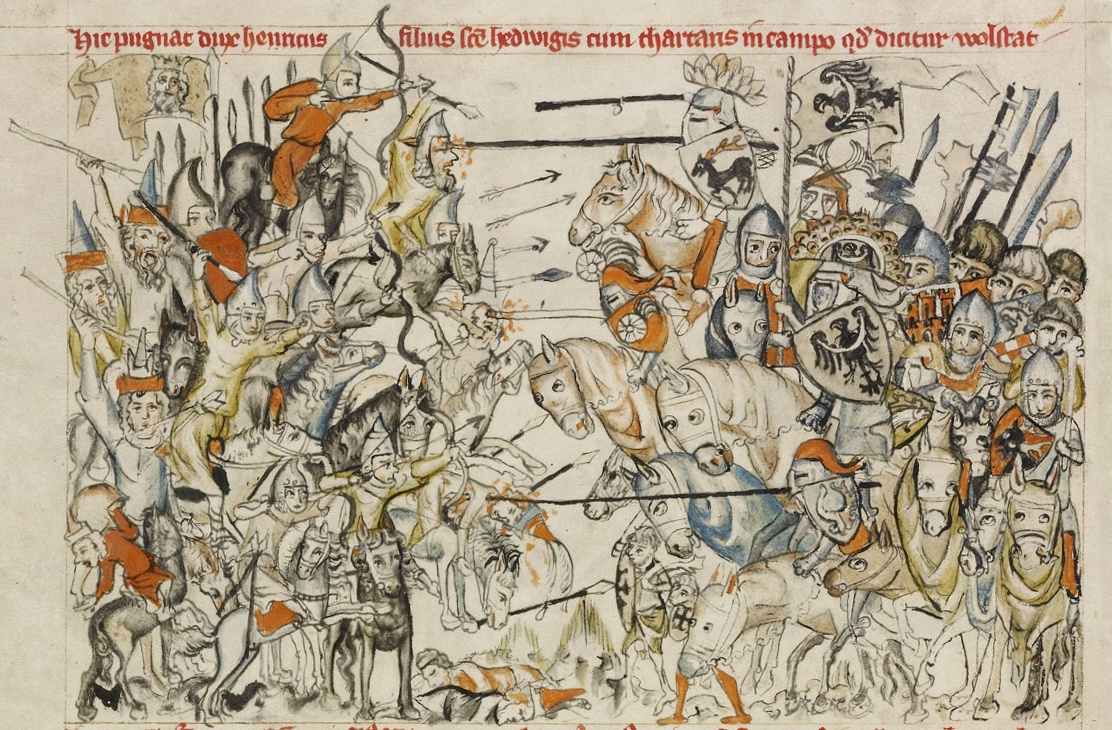
Battle of Legnica, medieval illuminated manuscript

The territory became part of the emerging Polish state in the 10th century. The village was the site of the decisive Battle of Legnica during the first Mongol invasion of Poland on 9 April 1241. In the battle, Mongols led by Kadan and Baidar defeated a Polish army aided by western volunteers under command of Polish ruler Henry II the Pious. The Mongols annihilated their opponents and joined with the main army in Hungary, but upon receiving the news of the death of their Grand Khan Ögedei Khan, they turned back to attend to the election of a new Khagan, or Grand Khan.

As a result of the fragmentation of Poland into smaller duchies, the village was part of the Duchy of Silesia until 1248 and the Duchy of Legnica afterwards, remaining under the rule of the Piast dynasty until its extinction in 1675. Afterwards it was incorporated into the Habsburg-ruled Kingdom of Bohemia. During the Thirty Years' War the village was plundered by the Swedes.

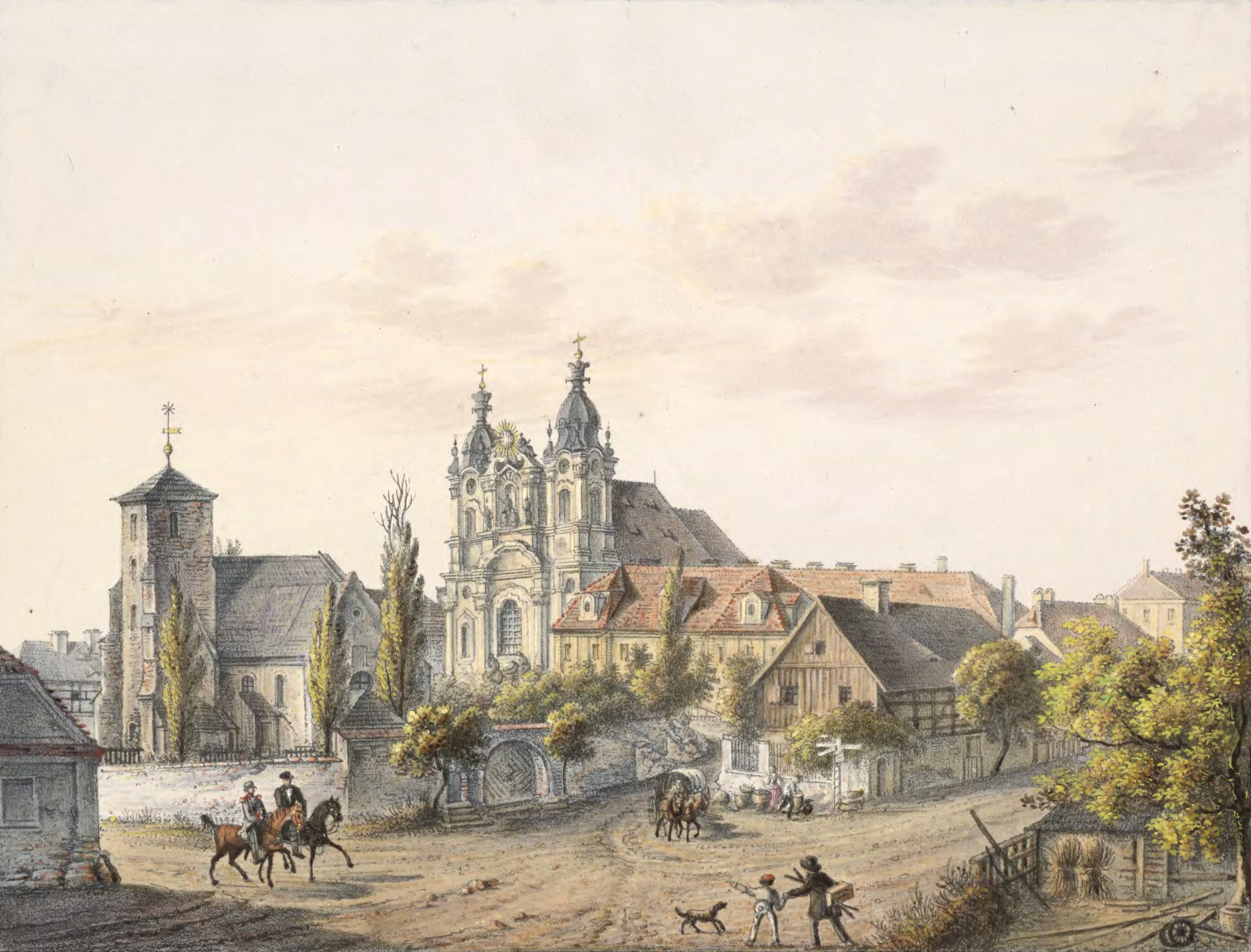
19th-century view of the village

The village was annexed by the Kingdom of Prussia during the Silesian Wars in 1742. During the Napoleonic Wars, the Prussian general Prince Blücher defeated a French army under Marshal MacDonald at the Kaczawa river (then Katzbach), a small river running through Legnickie Pole (then Wahlstatt) and Legnica (then Liegnitz), in the Battle of Katzbach on 26 August 1813. In honor of this victory Blücher received the title Prince of Wahlstatt on 3 June 1814. A Baroque abbey built before the Prussian annexation, in 1727 through 1733, with its complex of attendant buildings became a Prussian training institute for cadets in 1840. Among others, future field marshal and German president Paul von Hindenburg studied here from 1859 to 1863, as did the Red Baron, Manfred von Richthofen, until 1911.

As the Treaty of Versailles limited the size of the German military, the abbey was turned into a boarding school for boys in 1920. Under Nazi Germany, from 1934 it was first a National Political Institute of Education, and during World War II it was the location of the Oflag VIII-F prisoner-of-war camp for French POWs, Yugoslav and Italian POWs from 1940 to 1942 before its relocation to Moravská Třebová. In March 1943, the Germans established the Oflag 64 POW camp for Yugoslav officers and Soviet enlisted men, which was relocated to Szubin in May 1943.

The village became again part of Poland following the Nazi Germany's defeat in the war, although with a Soviet-installed communist regime, which stayed in power until the 1980s. The German-speaking population was expelled in accordance with the Potsdam Agreement. The village was given its current Polish name Legnickie Pole ("Field of Legnica", from 1945 to 1948 it was named Dobre Pole ["Good Field"]).

=== World War II and the GEMA Factory ===
During World War II, Legnickie Pole (then Wahlstatt) became a site for secret German military research. Following the closure of the main Oflag VIII-F prisoner-of-war camp, the historic Benedictine Abbey complex was handed over to **GEMA** (Gesellschaft für elektroakustische und mechanische Apparate). GEMA, a pioneering German defense electronics company, utilized the remote and sprawling facility to relocate its sensitive research, development, and assembly operations for advanced naval radar and sonar systems away from Allied bombing raids.

A dedicated sub-camp, designated Oflag VIII F/Z, was maintained on-site to provide labor for the factory, drawing from a mixed population of workers. While a detail of Allied POWs was kept behind to perform heavy construction and adapt the abbey's infrastructure, the factory floor also heavily relied on resettled prisoners (Umsiedler) and civil forced laborers relocated from occupied territories. Under severe wartime conditions, these diverse groups of prisoners were compelled to handle the delicate, labor-intensive assembly of components for critical military technology, including early warning radar units, until the approach of the Red Army forced the evacuation and liquidation of the plant in late 1944.

== Landmarks ==
- St. Jadwiga's Basilica and the Benedictines monastery, a Baroque abbey built between 1727 and 1733 with its complex of attendant buildings. The former abbey became a hospital for emotionally disturbed women in 1957, while the church remains a Catholic parish church
- Museum of the Battle of Legnica, dedicated to the 1241 battle, one of the largest battles of medieval Poland, located in the former Holy Trinity Church

The St. Jadwiga's Basilica and abbey along with the Museum of the Battle of Legnica were jointly designated one of Poland's official national Historic Monuments (Pomnik historii) on May 1, 2004, and are tracked by the National Heritage Board of Poland.

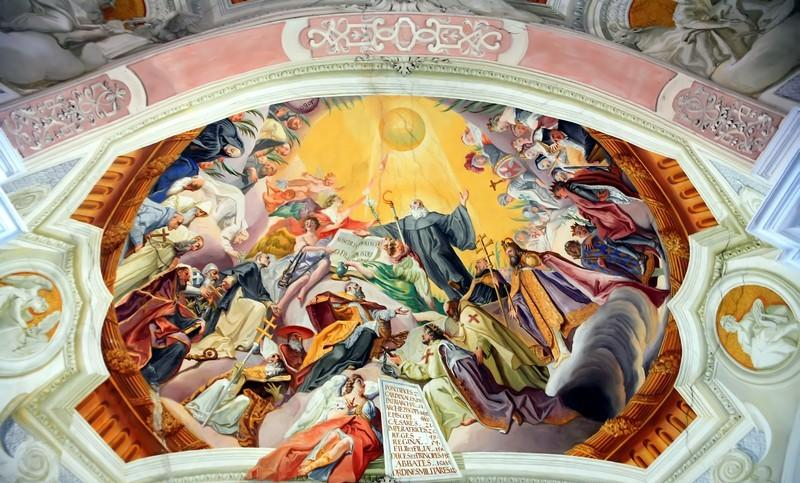
Frescos of the St. Jadwiga's Basilica

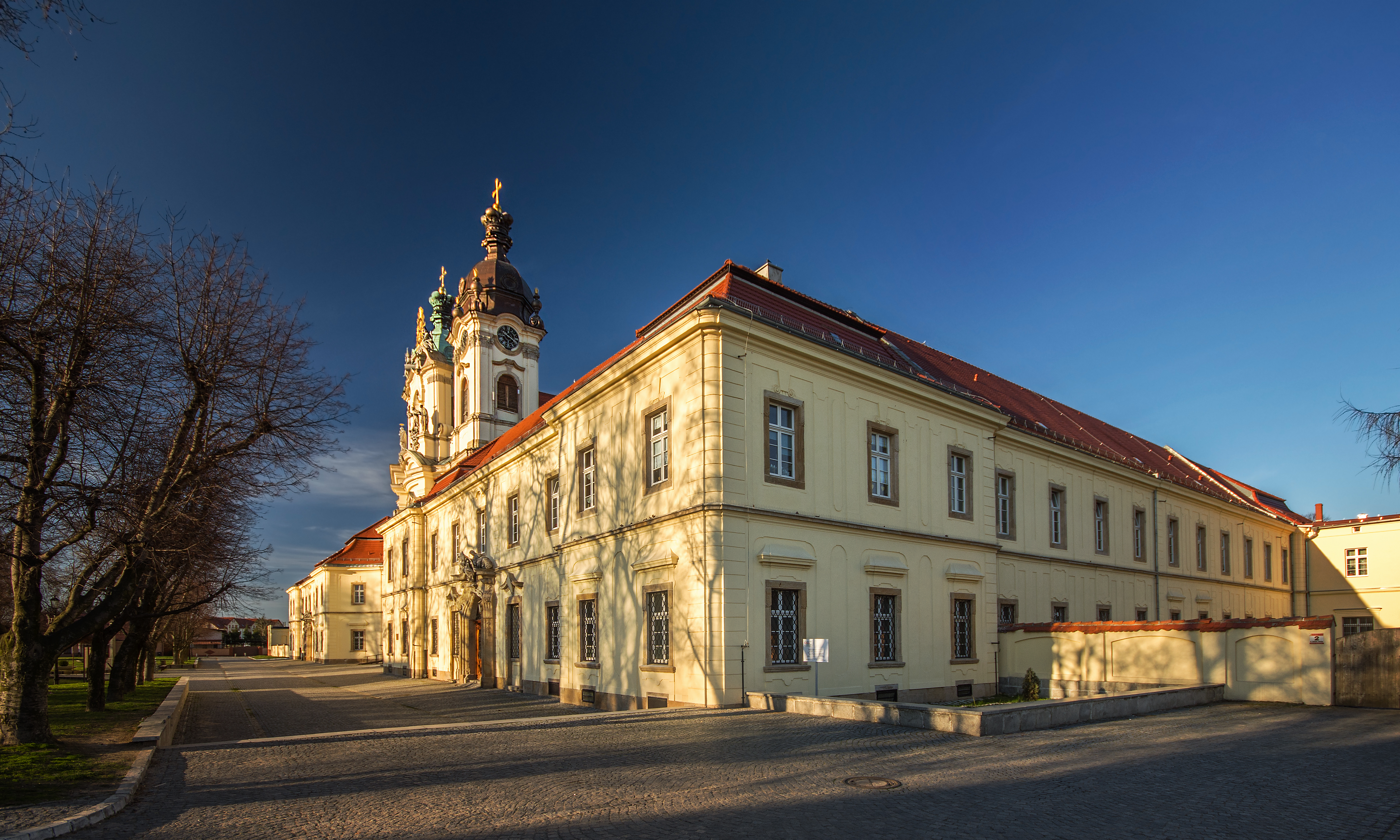
Former Benedictine monastery

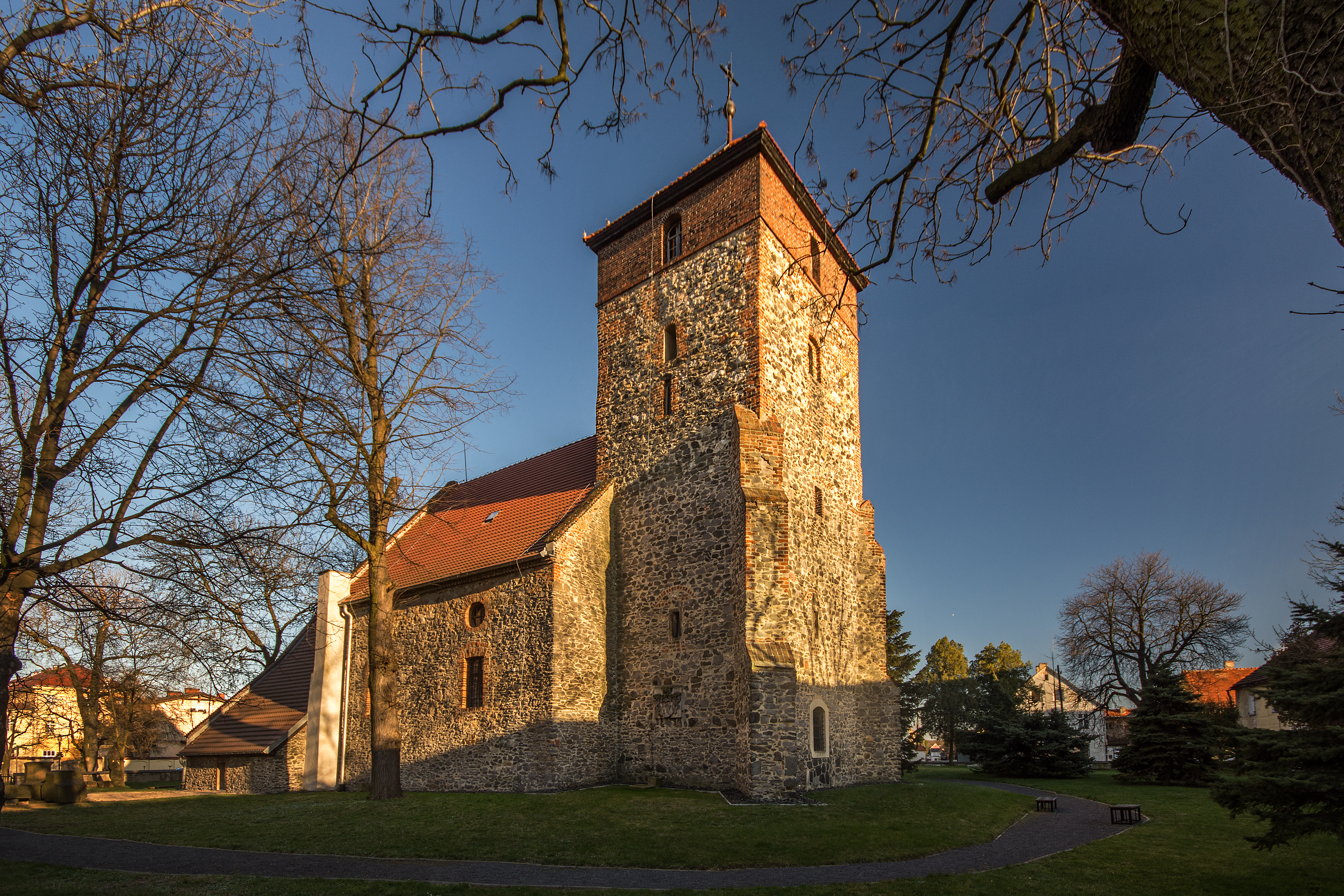
Museum of the Battle of Legnica
