= St. Jadwiga's Basilica, Legnickie Pole =

St. Jadwiga's Basilica
- Bazylika św. Jadwigi w Legnickim Polu
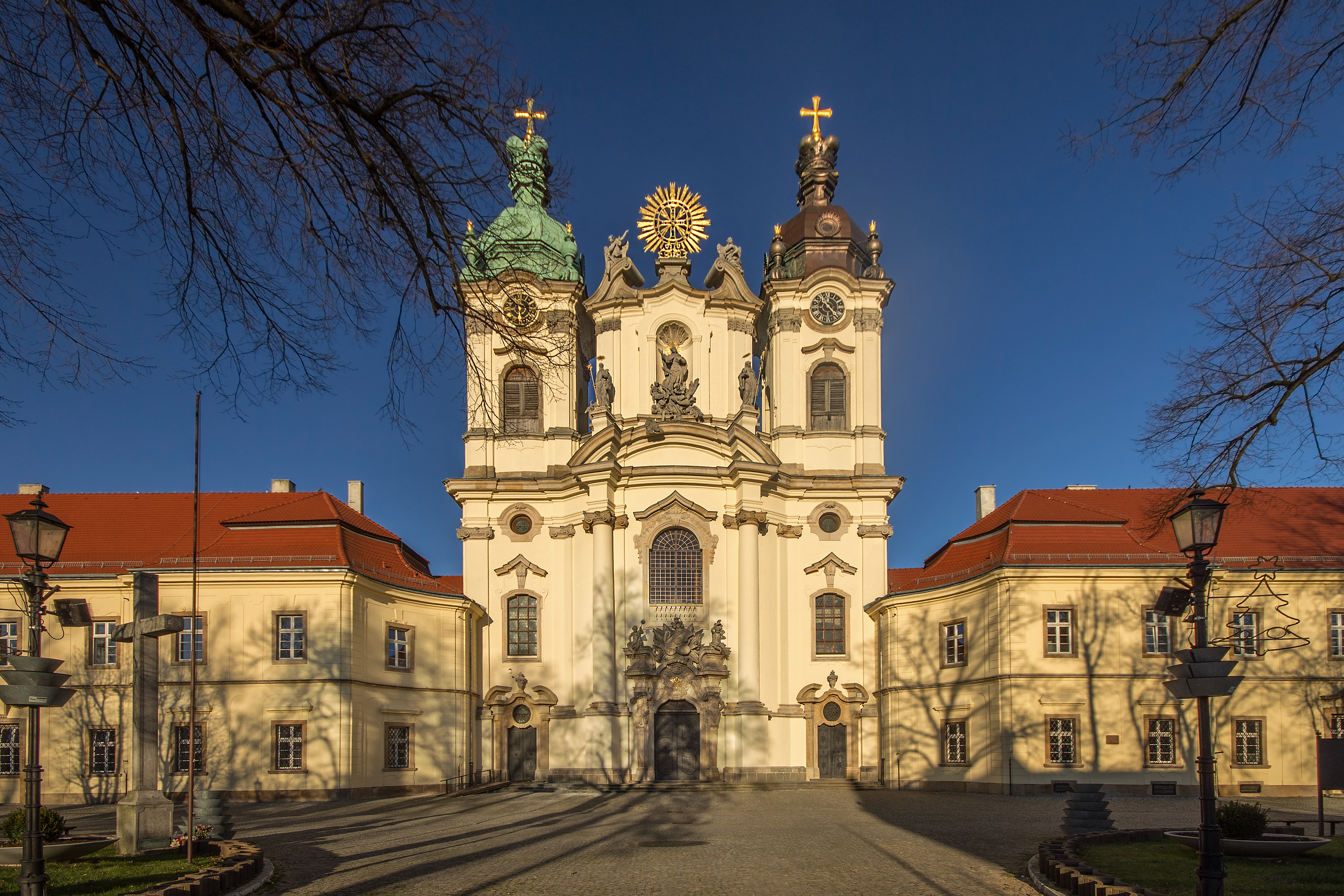
- St. Jadwiga's Basilica
- St. Jadwiga's Basilica
- 51.0845°N 16.1434°E
- Location: Legnickie Pole
- Country: Poland
- Denomination: Roman Catholic

Architecture
- Style: Baroque
- Groundbreaking: 1719
- Completed: 1729

Administration
- Archdiocese: Roman Catholic Archdiocese of Wrocław
- Parish: Parafia Podwyższenia Krzyża Świętego i św. Jadwigi Śląskiej w Legnickim Polu

Historic Monument of Poland
- Designated: 2004-04-14
- Part of: Legnickie Pole – former Benedictine abbey complex
- Reference no.: Dz. U. z 2004 r. Nr 102, poz. 1056

St. Jadwiga's Basilica is a church located in Legnickie Pole, Lower Silesian Voivodeship in Poland. The church hosts the Parish of the Holy Cross and St. Jadwiga and is the central element of the there-founded Monastery of the Order of Saint Benedict.
