= List of minor planets: 450001–451000 =

The following is a partial list of minor planets, running from minor-planet number 450001 through 451000, inclusive. The primary data for this and other partial lists is based on JPL's "Small-Body Orbital Elements" and data available from the Minor Planet Center. Critical list information is also provided by the MPC, unless otherwise specified from Lowell Observatory. A detailed description of the table's columns and additional sources are given on the main page including a complete list of every page in this series, and a statistical break-up on the dynamical classification of minor planets.

Also see the summary list of all named bodies in numerical and alphabetical order, and the corresponding naming citations for the number range of this particular list. New namings may only be added to this list after official publication, as the preannouncement of names is condemned by the Working Group for Small Bodies Nomenclature of the International Astronomical Union.

Near-Earth obj.	MBA (inner)	MBA (outer)	Centaur
Mars-crosser	MBA (middle)	Jupiter trojan	Trans-Neptunian obj.
Unclassified

== 450001–450100 ==
Designation			Discovery			Properties		Ref
Permanent	Provisional	Named after	Date	Site	Discoverer(s)	Category	Diam.	Ref
450001	2015 PA_{281}	—	September 8, 1996	Kitt Peak	Spacewatch	·	1.4 km	MPC · JPL
450002	2015 PT_{286}	—	November 11, 2006	Kitt Peak	Spacewatch	·	2.3 km	MPC · JPL
450003	2015 PT_{291}	—	October 3, 2006	Mount Lemmon	Mount Lemmon Survey	·	550 m	MPC · JPL
450004	2015 PJ_{293}	—	August 9, 2004	Socorro	LINEAR	V	740 m	MPC · JPL
450005	2015 PM_{293}	—	February 24, 2006	Kitt Peak	Spacewatch	·	2.0 km	MPC · JPL
450006	2015 PW_{293}	—	January 6, 2006	Catalina	CSS	·	4.7 km	MPC · JPL
450007	2015 PZ_{293}	—	January 25, 2006	Kitt Peak	Spacewatch	·	1.3 km	MPC · JPL
450008	2015 PK_{300}	—	August 8, 2004	Socorro	LINEAR	·	1.1 km	MPC · JPL
450009	2015 PQ_{307}	—	September 14, 2007	Mount Lemmon	Mount Lemmon Survey	EUN	1.1 km	MPC · JPL
450010	2015 PR_{307}	—	December 29, 2008	Kitt Peak	Spacewatch	·	1.1 km	MPC · JPL
450011	2015 PB_{308}	—	October 28, 2011	Catalina	CSS	·	1.5 km	MPC · JPL
450012	2015 PH_{308}	—	July 11, 2005	Kitt Peak	Spacewatch	·	2.8 km	MPC · JPL
450013	2015 PY_{308}	—	March 13, 2008	Kitt Peak	Spacewatch	·	3.4 km	MPC · JPL
450014	2015 PU_{309}	—	September 15, 2004	Kitt Peak	Spacewatch	·	1.1 km	MPC · JPL
450015	2015 PY_{309}	—	October 26, 2005	Kitt Peak	Spacewatch	V	640 m	MPC · JPL
450016	2015 PA_{310}	—	February 16, 2010	Kitt Peak	Spacewatch	·	1.5 km	MPC · JPL
450017	2015 PF_{310}	—	June 19, 2009	Kitt Peak	Spacewatch	·	4.6 km	MPC · JPL
450018	2015 PN_{310}	—	October 16, 1977	Palomar	C. J. van Houten, I. van Houten-Groeneveld, T. Gehrels	·	880 m	MPC · JPL
450019	2015 QN	—	January 29, 2010	WISE	WISE	·	2.4 km	MPC · JPL
450020	2015 QR	—	September 10, 2004	Socorro	LINEAR	·	3.7 km	MPC · JPL
450021	2015 QG_{2}	—	June 13, 2010	WISE	WISE	·	2.7 km	MPC · JPL
450022	2015 QG_{3}	—	October 29, 2005	Catalina	CSS	·	690 m	MPC · JPL
450023	2015 QY_{3}	—	October 14, 2004	Kitt Peak	Spacewatch	·	1.2 km	MPC · JPL
450024	2015 QF_{4}	—	December 5, 2005	Kitt Peak	Spacewatch	·	1.1 km	MPC · JPL
450025	2015 QM_{8}	—	September 27, 2008	Mount Lemmon	Mount Lemmon Survey	·	880 m	MPC · JPL
450026	2015 QL_{10}	—	October 2, 1995	Kitt Peak	Spacewatch	·	600 m	MPC · JPL
450027	2015 QS_{10}	—	September 9, 2004	Kitt Peak	Spacewatch	·	3.1 km	MPC · JPL
450028	2015 QT_{10}	—	September 23, 2000	Socorro	LINEAR	·	1.5 km	MPC · JPL
450029	2015 QE_{11}	—	August 6, 2004	Campo Imperatore	CINEOS	·	870 m	MPC · JPL
450030	2015 RK	—	October 9, 2010	Mount Lemmon	Mount Lemmon Survey	EOS	1.8 km	MPC · JPL
450031	2015 RN	—	October 14, 2007	Kitt Peak	Spacewatch	·	1.3 km	MPC · JPL
450032	2015 RZ	—	October 4, 2004	Kitt Peak	Spacewatch	THM	2.3 km	MPC · JPL
450033	2015 RA_{1}	—	December 30, 2005	Catalina	CSS	·	4.4 km	MPC · JPL
450034	2015 RD_{1}	—	February 21, 2007	Kitt Peak	Spacewatch	·	3.5 km	MPC · JPL
450035	2015 RM_{1}	—	October 30, 2011	Kitt Peak	Spacewatch	EUN	1.1 km	MPC · JPL
450036	2015 RN_{1}	—	November 28, 2005	Kitt Peak	Spacewatch	·	3.6 km	MPC · JPL
450037	2015 RZ_{2}	—	December 29, 2008	Mount Lemmon	Mount Lemmon Survey	·	2.1 km	MPC · JPL
450038	2015 RF_{3}	—	March 8, 2005	Kitt Peak	Spacewatch	EUN	1.2 km	MPC · JPL
450039	2015 RT_{18}	—	August 19, 2006	Kitt Peak	Spacewatch	EUN	1.2 km	MPC · JPL
450040	2015 RS_{19}	—	October 13, 2010	Mount Lemmon	Mount Lemmon Survey	·	2.2 km	MPC · JPL
450041	2015 RK_{20}	—	October 4, 2004	Kitt Peak	Spacewatch	NYS	1.3 km	MPC · JPL
450042	2015 RY_{22}	—	September 28, 2011	Mount Lemmon	Mount Lemmon Survey	·	1.5 km	MPC · JPL
450043	2015 RG_{24}	—	March 26, 2008	Mount Lemmon	Mount Lemmon Survey	EOS	1.6 km	MPC · JPL
450044	2015 RK_{24}	—	October 1, 2010	Catalina	CSS	·	3.4 km	MPC · JPL
450045	2015 RL_{24}	—	September 25, 2007	Mount Lemmon	Mount Lemmon Survey	RAF	690 m	MPC · JPL
450046	2015 RN_{25}	—	December 1, 2005	Kitt Peak	Spacewatch	EOS	2.2 km	MPC · JPL
450047	2015 RR_{25}	—	August 1, 2010	WISE	WISE	·	4.2 km	MPC · JPL
450048	2015 RH_{26}	—	September 13, 2004	Socorro	LINEAR	·	3.1 km	MPC · JPL
450049	2015 RX_{26}	—	February 1, 2006	Kitt Peak	Spacewatch	·	900 m	MPC · JPL
450050	2015 RB_{27}	—	October 15, 1998	Kitt Peak	Spacewatch	EUN	1.0 km	MPC · JPL
450051	2015 RC_{27}	—	May 13, 2005	Mount Lemmon	Mount Lemmon Survey	·	700 m	MPC · JPL
450052	2015 RF_{27}	—	November 16, 2000	Kitt Peak	Spacewatch	·	990 m	MPC · JPL
450053	2015 RH_{27}	—	October 16, 2007	Catalina	CSS	·	1.4 km	MPC · JPL
450054	2015 RO_{27}	—	September 18, 2006	Kitt Peak	Spacewatch	EUN	1.1 km	MPC · JPL
450055	2015 RC_{29}	—	January 28, 2007	Kitt Peak	Spacewatch	·	910 m	MPC · JPL
450056	2015 RY_{29}	—	September 25, 2007	Mount Lemmon	Mount Lemmon Survey	·	1.7 km	MPC · JPL
450057	2015 RA_{30}	—	February 21, 2007	Mount Lemmon	Mount Lemmon Survey	·	830 m	MPC · JPL
450058	2015 RQ_{30}	—	March 15, 2004	Kitt Peak	Spacewatch	·	1.8 km	MPC · JPL
450059	2015 RT_{30}	—	March 10, 2005	Mount Lemmon	Mount Lemmon Survey	·	2.0 km	MPC · JPL
450060	2015 RY_{40}	—	April 12, 2005	Mount Lemmon	Mount Lemmon Survey	·	1.4 km	MPC · JPL
450061	2015 RQ_{43}	—	June 11, 2010	Mount Lemmon	Mount Lemmon Survey	·	1.4 km	MPC · JPL
450062	2015 RX_{44}	—	September 5, 2005	Catalina	CSS	·	630 m	MPC · JPL
450063	2015 RQ_{45}	—	March 17, 2005	Mount Lemmon	Mount Lemmon Survey	·	1.7 km	MPC · JPL
450064	2015 RF_{46}	—	January 27, 2003	Socorro	LINEAR	·	1.6 km	MPC · JPL
450065	2015 RP_{46}	—	April 3, 2008	Mount Lemmon	Mount Lemmon Survey	·	1.6 km	MPC · JPL
450066	2015 RQ_{46}	—	November 20, 2003	Kitt Peak	Spacewatch	·	1.1 km	MPC · JPL
450067	2015 RC_{47}	—	October 20, 2006	Kitt Peak	Spacewatch	HOF	2.2 km	MPC · JPL
450068	2015 RK_{47}	—	February 2, 2006	Kitt Peak	Spacewatch	·	1.1 km	MPC · JPL
450069	2015 RM_{47}	—	September 18, 1998	Kitt Peak	Spacewatch	·	1.7 km	MPC · JPL
450070	2015 RV_{48}	—	August 7, 2008	Kitt Peak	Spacewatch	·	670 m	MPC · JPL
450071	2015 RZ_{48}	—	October 6, 2007	Kitt Peak	Spacewatch	·	1.2 km	MPC · JPL
450072	2015 RT_{50}	—	September 5, 2008	Kitt Peak	Spacewatch	·	790 m	MPC · JPL
450073	2015 RY_{50}	—	August 28, 2006	Kitt Peak	Spacewatch	·	2.3 km	MPC · JPL
450074	2015 RL_{52}	—	March 14, 2007	Mount Lemmon	Mount Lemmon Survey	NYS	820 m	MPC · JPL
450075	2015 RB_{53}	—	August 8, 2004	Socorro	LINEAR	·	1.2 km	MPC · JPL
450076	2015 RP_{58}	—	September 4, 2010	Mount Lemmon	Mount Lemmon Survey	·	1.6 km	MPC · JPL
450077	2015 RL_{62}	—	October 8, 2007	Mount Lemmon	Mount Lemmon Survey	·	990 m	MPC · JPL
450078	2015 RM_{73}	—	September 11, 2007	Mount Lemmon	Mount Lemmon Survey	·	1.2 km	MPC · JPL
450079	2015 RZ_{73}	—	March 3, 2006	Kitt Peak	Spacewatch	·	760 m	MPC · JPL
450080	2015 RX_{75}	—	February 1, 2008	Kitt Peak	Spacewatch	·	2.4 km	MPC · JPL
450081	2015 RH_{76}	—	October 11, 2004	Kitt Peak	Spacewatch	NYS	1.2 km	MPC · JPL
450082	2015 RL_{78}	—	February 23, 2007	Kitt Peak	Spacewatch	·	1.0 km	MPC · JPL
450083	2015 RU_{81}	—	October 10, 2004	Kitt Peak	Spacewatch	·	3.2 km	MPC · JPL
450084	2015 RL_{84}	—	September 16, 2006	Catalina	CSS	·	2.4 km	MPC · JPL
450085	2015 RT_{85}	—	September 25, 2006	Catalina	CSS	·	2.2 km	MPC · JPL
450086	2015 RG_{88}	—	December 21, 2006	Mount Lemmon	Mount Lemmon Survey	·	930 m	MPC · JPL
450087	2015 RD_{90}	—	February 20, 2002	Kitt Peak	Spacewatch	LIX	4.6 km	MPC · JPL
450088	2015 RY_{90}	—	November 5, 2005	Catalina	CSS	·	3.2 km	MPC · JPL
450089	2015 RD_{91}	—	February 21, 2007	Mount Lemmon	Mount Lemmon Survey	VER	3.9 km	MPC · JPL
450090	2015 RE_{91}	—	November 9, 1999	Kitt Peak	Spacewatch	(8737)	2.6 km	MPC · JPL
450091	2015 RR_{91}	—	April 13, 2004	Kitt Peak	Spacewatch	·	1.8 km	MPC · JPL
450092	2015 RB_{92}	—	October 25, 2005	Kitt Peak	Spacewatch	·	760 m	MPC · JPL
450093	2015 RS_{92}	—	November 19, 2008	Mount Lemmon	Mount Lemmon Survey	·	1.2 km	MPC · JPL
450094	2015 RU_{92}	—	January 18, 2008	Kitt Peak	Spacewatch	(1547)	1.1 km	MPC · JPL
450095	2015 RW_{92}	—	January 27, 2007	Mount Lemmon	Mount Lemmon Survey	·	3.9 km	MPC · JPL
450096	2015 RB_{93}	—	September 19, 1995	Kitt Peak	Spacewatch	·	640 m	MPC · JPL
450097	2015 RA_{94}	—	February 28, 2008	Mount Lemmon	Mount Lemmon Survey	·	2.8 km	MPC · JPL
450098	2015 RD_{94}	—	March 4, 2008	Mount Lemmon	Mount Lemmon Survey	·	2.8 km	MPC · JPL
450099	2015 RZ_{94}	—	November 16, 2009	Mount Lemmon	Mount Lemmon Survey	·	580 m	MPC · JPL
450100	2015 RY_{95}	—	October 23, 2011	Kitt Peak	Spacewatch	·	2.2 km	MPC · JPL

== 450101–450200 ==
back to top

Designation			Discovery			Properties		Ref
Permanent	Provisional	Named after	Date	Site	Discoverer(s)	Category	Diam.	Ref
450101	2015 RN_{97}	—	October 7, 2000	Kitt Peak	Spacewatch	·	1.4 km	MPC · JPL
450102	2015 RJ_{100}	—	October 7, 2004	Anderson Mesa	LONEOS	THM	2.6 km	MPC · JPL
450103	2015 RS_{101}	—	September 18, 2006	Catalina	CSS	·	1.7 km	MPC · JPL
450104	2015 RZ_{102}	—	August 29, 2006	Catalina	CSS	·	1.8 km	MPC · JPL
450105	2015 RA_{104}	—	July 3, 2005	Mount Lemmon	Mount Lemmon Survey	615	1.6 km	MPC · JPL
450106	2015 RP_{104}	—	April 15, 2007	Kitt Peak	Spacewatch	·	1.0 km	MPC · JPL
450107	2015 RW_{104}	—	October 28, 2005	Kitt Peak	Spacewatch	·	570 m	MPC · JPL
450108	2015 RH_{105}	—	December 28, 2005	Kitt Peak	Spacewatch	·	1.7 km	MPC · JPL
450109	2015 RK_{105}	—	August 31, 2005	Kitt Peak	Spacewatch	·	1.6 km	MPC · JPL
450110	2015 RO_{105}	—	March 9, 2007	Kitt Peak	Spacewatch	EOS	1.9 km	MPC · JPL
450111	2015 RZ_{105}	—	January 31, 2009	Kitt Peak	Spacewatch	·	990 m	MPC · JPL
450112	2015 RG_{106}	—	September 11, 2007	Mount Lemmon	Mount Lemmon Survey	·	1.1 km	MPC · JPL
450113	2015 RR_{106}	—	October 1, 2005	Catalina	CSS	·	2.2 km	MPC · JPL
450114	2015 RL_{107}	—	June 22, 2007	Kitt Peak	Spacewatch	NYS	1.0 km	MPC · JPL
450115	2015 RU_{107}	—	December 4, 2008	Mount Lemmon	Mount Lemmon Survey	NYS	1.1 km	MPC · JPL
450116	2015 RP_{108}	—	November 26, 2011	Mount Lemmon	Mount Lemmon Survey	·	1.5 km	MPC · JPL
450117	2015 RB_{109}	—	April 8, 2002	Kitt Peak	Spacewatch	·	3.7 km	MPC · JPL
450118	2015 RD_{110}	—	August 29, 2006	Kitt Peak	Spacewatch	·	1.6 km	MPC · JPL
450119	2015 RS_{114}	—	January 27, 2007	Kitt Peak	Spacewatch	·	2.8 km	MPC · JPL
450120	2015 RE_{117}	—	October 16, 2006	Catalina	CSS	·	1.8 km	MPC · JPL
450121	2015 RF_{121}	—	October 9, 2008	Kitt Peak	Spacewatch	·	820 m	MPC · JPL
450122	2015 RW_{124}	—	September 15, 2010	Kitt Peak	Spacewatch	·	2.8 km	MPC · JPL
450123	2015 RK_{131}	—	September 3, 2008	Kitt Peak	Spacewatch	·	1.1 km	MPC · JPL
450124	2015 RB_{139}	—	January 7, 2006	Mount Lemmon	Mount Lemmon Survey	·	3.0 km	MPC · JPL
450125	2015 RV_{198}	—	June 24, 2009	Kitt Peak	Spacewatch	LIX	3.6 km	MPC · JPL
450126	2015 RJ_{213}	—	May 11, 2010	Mount Lemmon	Mount Lemmon Survey	·	1.4 km	MPC · JPL
450127	2015 RS_{213}	—	February 1, 2001	Kitt Peak	Spacewatch	·	3.5 km	MPC · JPL
450128	2015 RT_{243}	—	September 19, 2003	Kitt Peak	Spacewatch	·	2.5 km	MPC · JPL
450129	2015 RD_{245}	—	December 6, 2008	Kitt Peak	Spacewatch	·	3.9 km	MPC · JPL
450130	2015 SP_{3}	—	May 23, 2006	Siding Spring	SSS	·	1.7 km	MPC · JPL
450131	2015 SE_{5}	—	March 8, 2008	Kitt Peak	Spacewatch	·	3.5 km	MPC · JPL
450132	2015 SO_{5}	—	October 10, 2005	Catalina	CSS	·	780 m	MPC · JPL
450133	2015 SW_{5}	—	August 29, 2006	Kitt Peak	Spacewatch	·	2.0 km	MPC · JPL
450134	1994 WH_{4}	—	November 26, 1994	Kitt Peak	Spacewatch	(5)	1.4 km	MPC · JPL
450135	1995 SW_{20}	—	September 19, 1995	Kitt Peak	Spacewatch	BRA	2.2 km	MPC · JPL
450136	1995 SZ_{57}	—	September 22, 1995	Kitt Peak	Spacewatch	·	1.5 km	MPC · JPL
450137	1996 AF_{6}	—	January 12, 1996	Kitt Peak	Spacewatch	V	570 m	MPC · JPL
450138	1998 BO_{26}	—	January 28, 1998	Haleakala	NEAT	·	1.4 km	MPC · JPL
450139	1998 SR_{148}	—	September 26, 1998	Socorro	LINEAR	(5)	1.3 km	MPC · JPL
450140	1998 TL_{27}	—	October 15, 1998	Kitt Peak	Spacewatch	·	960 m	MPC · JPL
450141	1998 VH_{43}	—	October 20, 1998	Kitt Peak	Spacewatch	·	1.2 km	MPC · JPL
450142	1998 XN_{2}	—	December 9, 1998	Socorro	LINEAR	APO · PHA	380 m	MPC · JPL
450143	1999 ED_{5}	—	March 13, 1999	Kitt Peak	Spacewatch	APO	450 m	MPC · JPL
450144	1999 RJ_{30}	—	September 8, 1999	Socorro	LINEAR	·	4.3 km	MPC · JPL
450145	1999 RU_{140}	—	September 9, 1999	Socorro	LINEAR	·	2.2 km	MPC · JPL
450146	1999 TZ_{70}	—	October 9, 1999	Kitt Peak	Spacewatch	·	1 km	MPC · JPL
450147	1999 TT_{84}	—	October 13, 1999	Kitt Peak	Spacewatch	·	2.0 km	MPC · JPL
450148	1999 TJ_{170}	—	October 10, 1999	Socorro	LINEAR	·	2.1 km	MPC · JPL
450149	1999 VZ_{109}	—	November 9, 1999	Socorro	LINEAR	·	2.4 km	MPC · JPL
450150	1999 VA_{119}	—	October 18, 1999	Kitt Peak	Spacewatch	·	2.0 km	MPC · JPL
450151	1999 VK_{129}	—	October 11, 1999	Socorro	LINEAR	·	2.3 km	MPC · JPL
450152	1999 VA_{147}	—	November 12, 1999	Socorro	LINEAR	·	1.1 km	MPC · JPL
450153	2000 AL_{48}	—	January 6, 2000	Prescott	P. G. Comba	·	1.4 km	MPC · JPL
450154	2000 AM_{49}	—	January 5, 2000	Socorro	LINEAR	·	590 m	MPC · JPL
450155	2000 AK_{126}	—	January 5, 2000	Socorro	LINEAR	·	3.7 km	MPC · JPL
450156	2000 AT_{210}	—	December 18, 1999	Kitt Peak	Spacewatch	(5)	1.2 km	MPC · JPL
450157	2000 DE_{65}	—	February 29, 2000	Socorro	LINEAR	·	1.0 km	MPC · JPL
450158	2000 DW_{98}	—	February 29, 2000	Socorro	LINEAR	·	2.1 km	MPC · JPL
450159	2000 JJ_{5}	—	May 3, 2000	Socorro	LINEAR	APO	740 m	MPC · JPL
450160	2000 RM_{12}	—	September 1, 2000	Socorro	LINEAR	T_{j} (2.69) · APO +1km	1.6 km	MPC · JPL
450161	2000 YE_{29}	—	December 22, 2000	Anderson Mesa	LONEOS	·	1.4 km	MPC · JPL
450162	2001 KJ_{33}	—	May 24, 2001	Socorro	LINEAR	·	1.5 km	MPC · JPL
450163	2001 ML_{31}	—	June 28, 2001	Anderson Mesa	LONEOS	·	790 m	MPC · JPL
450164	2001 OP_{2}	—	July 17, 2001	Anderson Mesa	LONEOS	·	970 m	MPC · JPL
450165	2001 QL_{189}	—	August 22, 2001	Socorro	LINEAR	·	1.9 km	MPC · JPL
450166	2001 RP_{122}	—	September 12, 2001	Socorro	LINEAR	·	2.2 km	MPC · JPL
450167	2001 RW_{149}	—	September 11, 2001	Anderson Mesa	LONEOS	·	2.3 km	MPC · JPL
450168	2001 SS_{140}	—	September 16, 2001	Socorro	LINEAR	·	1.8 km	MPC · JPL
450169	2001 SB_{198}	—	September 19, 2001	Socorro	LINEAR	AEO	1.0 km	MPC · JPL
450170	2001 SV_{201}	—	September 19, 2001	Socorro	LINEAR	·	460 m	MPC · JPL
450171	2001 SW_{317}	—	September 19, 2001	Socorro	LINEAR	(18466)	2.2 km	MPC · JPL
450172	2001 SV_{332}	—	September 19, 2001	Socorro	LINEAR	·	1.6 km	MPC · JPL
450173	2001 TZ_{9}	—	October 13, 2001	Socorro	LINEAR	·	1.3 km	MPC · JPL
450174	2001 TD_{19}	—	October 15, 2001	Nashville	Clingan, R.	·	740 m	MPC · JPL
450175	2001 TZ_{96}	—	October 14, 2001	Socorro	LINEAR	·	670 m	MPC · JPL
450176	2001 TV_{99}	—	October 14, 2001	Socorro	LINEAR	·	2.0 km	MPC · JPL
450177	2001 TQ_{161}	—	October 11, 2001	Palomar	NEAT	·	610 m	MPC · JPL
450178	2001 TV_{251}	—	October 14, 2001	Apache Point	SDSS	·	500 m	MPC · JPL
450179	2001 TW_{259}	—	October 10, 2001	Palomar	NEAT	·	1.8 km	MPC · JPL
450180	2001 TR_{260}	—	October 14, 2001	Apache Point	SDSS	·	1.7 km	MPC · JPL
450181	2001 VH_{63}	—	November 10, 2001	Socorro	LINEAR	·	2.6 km	MPC · JPL
450182	2001 VY_{73}	—	November 11, 2001	Socorro	LINEAR	·	3.1 km	MPC · JPL
450183	2001 VX_{83}	—	November 11, 2001	Socorro	LINEAR	·	2.3 km	MPC · JPL
450184	2001 VY_{88}	—	November 11, 2001	Socorro	LINEAR	·	2.5 km	MPC · JPL
450185	2001 WJ_{2}	—	November 19, 2001	Socorro	LINEAR	AMO	330 m	MPC · JPL
450186	2001 WA_{21}	—	October 17, 2001	Kitt Peak	Spacewatch	·	2.6 km	MPC · JPL
450187	2001 WC_{56}	—	November 19, 2001	Socorro	LINEAR	·	900 m	MPC · JPL
450188	2001 XB_{33}	—	December 10, 2001	Kitt Peak	Spacewatch	·	1.9 km	MPC · JPL
450189	2001 XY_{72}	—	November 19, 2001	Anderson Mesa	LONEOS	(32418)	1.8 km	MPC · JPL
450190	2001 XJ_{104}	—	December 15, 2001	Socorro	LINEAR	H	630 m	MPC · JPL
450191	2001 XA_{223}	—	December 15, 2001	Socorro	LINEAR	·	900 m	MPC · JPL
450192	2001 XQ_{228}	—	December 15, 2001	Socorro	LINEAR	·	730 m	MPC · JPL
450193	2001 XD_{229}	—	December 15, 2001	Socorro	LINEAR	·	640 m	MPC · JPL
450194	2002 CN_{38}	—	February 7, 2002	Kitt Peak	Spacewatch	·	1.5 km	MPC · JPL
450195	2002 CZ_{195}	—	February 10, 2002	Socorro	LINEAR	·	810 m	MPC · JPL
450196	2002 CZ_{288}	—	February 10, 2002	Socorro	LINEAR	·	1.1 km	MPC · JPL
450197	2002 EG_{24}	—	March 5, 2002	Kitt Peak	Spacewatch	·	1.2 km	MPC · JPL
450198	2002 EW_{119}	—	March 10, 2002	Kitt Peak	Spacewatch	·	1.1 km	MPC · JPL
450199	2002 GN_{120}	—	April 12, 2002	Socorro	LINEAR	·	3.5 km	MPC · JPL
450200	2002 GW_{189}	—	April 5, 2002	Palomar	NEAT	·	2.6 km	MPC · JPL

== 450201–450300 ==
back to top

Designation			Discovery			Properties		Ref
Permanent	Provisional	Named after	Date	Site	Discoverer(s)	Category	Diam.	Ref
450201	2002 JC_{116}	—	May 10, 2002	Palomar	NEAT	·	1.6 km	MPC · JPL
450202	2002 JH_{128}	—	April 10, 2002	Socorro	LINEAR	PHO	1.4 km	MPC · JPL
450203	2002 NA_{31}	—	July 15, 2002	Socorro	LINEAR	AMO	340 m	MPC · JPL
450204	2002 ND_{36}	—	July 9, 2002	Socorro	LINEAR	·	1.2 km	MPC · JPL
450205	2002 OP_{2}	—	July 17, 2002	Socorro	LINEAR	·	1.7 km	MPC · JPL
450206	2002 ON_{15}	—	July 18, 2002	Socorro	LINEAR	JUN	790 m	MPC · JPL
450207	2002 OC_{30}	—	July 20, 2002	Palomar	NEAT	EUN	1.1 km	MPC · JPL
450208	2002 PS_{31}	—	August 6, 2002	Palomar	NEAT	·	740 m	MPC · JPL
450209	2002 PZ_{34}	—	August 5, 2002	Campo Imperatore	CINEOS	·	1.3 km	MPC · JPL
450210	2002 PR_{175}	—	September 14, 1998	Kitt Peak	Spacewatch	(5)	1.1 km	MPC · JPL
450211	2002 PW_{180}	—	August 15, 2002	Palomar	NEAT	·	970 m	MPC · JPL
450212	2002 QE_{71}	—	August 18, 2002	Palomar	NEAT	·	1.0 km	MPC · JPL
450213	2002 QB_{83}	—	August 16, 2002	Palomar	NEAT	·	1.3 km	MPC · JPL
450214	2002 RQ_{109}	—	September 6, 2002	Socorro	LINEAR	·	1.3 km	MPC · JPL
450215	2002 RY_{136}	—	September 12, 2002	Palomar	NEAT	·	1.3 km	MPC · JPL
450216	2002 RG_{182}	—	September 11, 2002	Palomar	NEAT	·	1.9 km	MPC · JPL
450217	2002 RE_{268}	—	September 1, 2002	Palomar	NEAT	·	680 m	MPC · JPL
450218	2002 SW_{1}	—	September 26, 2002	Palomar	NEAT	MIS	2.2 km	MPC · JPL
450219	2002 SV_{34}	—	September 29, 2002	Haleakala	NEAT	·	1.3 km	MPC · JPL
450220	2002 TC_{2}	—	October 1, 2002	Anderson Mesa	LONEOS	H	460 m	MPC · JPL
450221	2002 TP_{4}	—	October 1, 2002	Socorro	LINEAR	·	1.7 km	MPC · JPL
450222	2002 TF_{60}	—	October 3, 2002	Palomar	NEAT	·	1.2 km	MPC · JPL
450223	2002 TG_{154}	—	October 5, 2002	Socorro	LINEAR	MAR	1.4 km	MPC · JPL
450224	2002 TW_{189}	—	October 5, 2002	Socorro	LINEAR	·	610 m	MPC · JPL
450225	2002 TR_{199}	—	October 5, 2002	Socorro	LINEAR	EUN	1.4 km	MPC · JPL
450226	2002 TA_{220}	—	October 5, 2002	Socorro	LINEAR	·	650 m	MPC · JPL
450227	2002 TS_{303}	—	October 4, 2002	Apache Point	SDSS	·	990 m	MPC · JPL
450228	2002 TD_{332}	—	October 5, 2002	Apache Point	SDSS	·	1.2 km	MPC · JPL
450229	2002 TX_{367}	—	October 10, 2002	Apache Point	SDSS	·	1.5 km	MPC · JPL
450230	2002 TQ_{368}	—	October 10, 2002	Apache Point	SDSS	·	1.3 km	MPC · JPL
450231	2002 TQ_{376}	—	October 6, 2002	Socorro	LINEAR	(1547)	1.4 km	MPC · JPL
450232	2002 UJ_{46}	—	October 31, 2002	Kitt Peak	Spacewatch	·	600 m	MPC · JPL
450233	2002 UH_{79}	—	October 30, 2002	Haleakala	NEAT	·	1.5 km	MPC · JPL
450234	2002 VN_{117}	—	November 14, 2002	Nogales	Tenagra II	·	1.4 km	MPC · JPL
450235	2002 VW_{140}	—	November 12, 2002	Palomar	NEAT	·	2.2 km	MPC · JPL
450236	2002 WO_{24}	—	November 16, 2002	Palomar	NEAT	·	1.1 km	MPC · JPL
450237	2002 XY_{38}	—	December 7, 2002	Palomar	NEAT	ATE	100 m	MPC · JPL
450238	2002 XN_{40}	—	December 11, 2002	Socorro	LINEAR	AMO +1km	1.2 km	MPC · JPL
450239	2002 XA_{119}	—	December 10, 2002	Palomar	NEAT	·	1 km	MPC · JPL
450240	2003 AO_{53}	—	December 27, 2002	Anderson Mesa	LONEOS	·	2.4 km	MPC · JPL
450241	2003 AQ_{85}	—	January 11, 2003	Palomar	NEAT	·	1.5 km	MPC · JPL
450242	2003 DG	—	February 19, 2003	Haleakala	NEAT	·	2.1 km	MPC · JPL
450243	2003 EF_{46}	—	March 7, 2003	Anderson Mesa	LONEOS	·	1.6 km	MPC · JPL
450244	2003 FA_{68}	—	March 26, 2003	Kitt Peak	Spacewatch	·	2.5 km	MPC · JPL
450245	2003 GX_{21}	—	April 7, 2003	Kitt Peak	Spacewatch	H	470 m	MPC · JPL
450246	2003 HP_{46}	—	April 28, 2003	Socorro	LINEAR	·	1.3 km	MPC · JPL
450247	2003 SY_{112}	—	September 16, 2003	Kitt Peak	Spacewatch	·	2.4 km	MPC · JPL
450248	2003 SF_{338}	—	September 26, 2003	Apache Point	SDSS	·	1.1 km	MPC · JPL
450249	2003 SQ_{360}	—	September 21, 2003	Kitt Peak	Spacewatch	EOS	1.9 km	MPC · JPL
450250	2003 SL_{379}	—	September 26, 2003	Apache Point	SDSS	·	2.0 km	MPC · JPL
450251	2003 TO_{3}	—	October 4, 2003	Goodricke-Pigott	Reddy, V.	THB	3.9 km	MPC · JPL
450252	2003 UC_{310}	—	October 20, 2003	Kitt Peak	Spacewatch	·	1.3 km	MPC · JPL
450253	2003 UO_{335}	—	October 18, 2003	Apache Point	SDSS	·	2.6 km	MPC · JPL
450254	2003 UU_{348}	—	October 19, 2003	Apache Point	SDSS	·	3.9 km	MPC · JPL
450255	2003 UX_{370}	—	October 22, 2003	Apache Point	SDSS	URS	2.8 km	MPC · JPL
450256	2003 UO_{373}	—	October 22, 2003	Apache Point	SDSS	·	2.2 km	MPC · JPL
450257	2003 WA	—	November 16, 2003	Kitt Peak	Spacewatch	·	340 m	MPC · JPL
450258	2003 WD_{5}	—	November 16, 2003	Kitt Peak	Spacewatch	·	810 m	MPC · JPL
450259	2003 WQ_{7}	—	November 19, 2003	Socorro	LINEAR	APO	370 m	MPC · JPL
450260	2003 WC_{21}	—	November 19, 2003	Socorro	LINEAR	·	1.5 km	MPC · JPL
450261	2003 WP_{39}	—	November 19, 2003	Kitt Peak	Spacewatch	·	4.8 km	MPC · JPL
450262	2003 WF_{140}	—	November 21, 2003	Socorro	LINEAR	EUN	1.4 km	MPC · JPL
450263	2003 WD_{158}	—	November 30, 2003	Socorro	LINEAR	APO · PHA · slow	620 m	MPC · JPL
450264	2003 WM_{167}	—	November 19, 2003	Palomar	NEAT	·	1.1 km	MPC · JPL
450265	2003 WU_{172}	—	November 21, 2003	Kitt Peak	Spacewatch	plutino	261 km	MPC · JPL
450266	2003 YJ_{14}	—	December 17, 2003	Socorro	LINEAR	MAR	1.4 km	MPC · JPL
450267	2003 YF_{83}	—	December 18, 2003	Kitt Peak	Spacewatch	·	1.4 km	MPC · JPL
450268	2003 YX_{114}	—	December 19, 2003	Kitt Peak	Spacewatch	·	990 m	MPC · JPL
450269	2003 YV_{130}	—	December 28, 2003	Socorro	LINEAR	·	1.5 km	MPC · JPL
450270	2004 AE	—	January 4, 2004	Socorro	LINEAR	APO · PHA	270 m	MPC · JPL
450271	2004 BA_{12}	—	December 30, 2003	Kitt Peak	Spacewatch	·	1.3 km	MPC · JPL
450272	2004 BG_{15}	—	January 16, 2004	Kitt Peak	Spacewatch	(5)	1.1 km	MPC · JPL
450273	2004 BL_{68}	—	January 19, 2004	Haleakala	NEAT	·	2.0 km	MPC · JPL
450274	2004 BQ_{102}	—	January 30, 2004	Socorro	LINEAR	·	1.7 km	MPC · JPL
450275	2004 BR_{137}	—	January 19, 2004	Kitt Peak	Spacewatch	·	1.1 km	MPC · JPL
450276	2004 BL_{146}	—	January 22, 2004	Socorro	LINEAR	MAR	1.1 km	MPC · JPL
450277	2004 CY_{103}	—	February 13, 2004	Palomar	NEAT	(1547)	1.5 km	MPC · JPL
450278	2004 CY_{112}	—	February 13, 2004	Anderson Mesa	LONEOS	RAF	1.0 km	MPC · JPL
450279	2004 DR_{13}	—	February 16, 2004	Kitt Peak	Spacewatch	·	2.1 km	MPC · JPL
450280	2004 DW_{29}	—	February 17, 2004	Socorro	LINEAR	·	1.5 km	MPC · JPL
450281	2004 ER_{35}	—	March 13, 2004	Palomar	NEAT	·	1.7 km	MPC · JPL
450282	2004 EM_{47}	—	March 15, 2004	Catalina	CSS	·	1.0 km	MPC · JPL
450283	2004 EM_{64}	—	February 26, 2004	Socorro	LINEAR	·	1.2 km	MPC · JPL
450284	2004 FF_{30}	—	March 19, 2004	Catalina	CSS	·	2.8 km	MPC · JPL
450285	2004 FG_{57}	—	March 17, 2004	Kitt Peak	Spacewatch	·	620 m	MPC · JPL
450286	2004 HQ_{5}	—	April 9, 2004	Siding Spring	SSS	·	2.3 km	MPC · JPL
450287	2004 HB_{46}	—	April 21, 2004	Siding Spring	SSS	·	1.4 km	MPC · JPL
450288	2004 HR_{78}	—	April 22, 2004	Kitt Peak	Spacewatch	·	1.5 km	MPC · JPL
450289	2004 JV_{13}	—	May 9, 2004	Kitt Peak	Spacewatch	JUN	1.1 km	MPC · JPL
450290	2004 JR_{20}	—	May 14, 2004	Socorro	LINEAR	H	610 m	MPC · JPL
450291	2004 JT_{20}	—	May 15, 2004	Socorro	LINEAR	H	590 m	MPC · JPL
450292	2004 KU	—	May 17, 2004	Socorro	LINEAR	·	2.2 km	MPC · JPL
450293	2004 LV_{3}	—	June 12, 2004	Socorro	LINEAR	APO · PHA	610 m	MPC · JPL
450294	2004 LW_{24}	—	June 14, 2004	Kitt Peak	Spacewatch	·	2.9 km	MPC · JPL
450295	2004 MB	—	June 16, 2004	Kitt Peak	Spacewatch	·	650 m	MPC · JPL
450296	2004 PE_{40}	—	August 9, 2004	Socorro	LINEAR	·	970 m	MPC · JPL
450297 Csákánybéla	2004 PN_{42}	Csákánybéla	August 8, 2004	Piszkéstető	K. Sárneczky, T. Szalai	·	790 m	MPC · JPL
450298	2004 PG_{55}	—	August 8, 2004	Palomar	NEAT	·	790 m	MPC · JPL
450299	2004 PN_{110}	—	August 12, 2004	Socorro	LINEAR	·	770 m	MPC · JPL
450300	2004 QD_{14}	—	August 24, 2004	Siding Spring	SSS	ATE · PHA	260 m	MPC · JPL

== 450301–450400 ==
back to top

Designation			Discovery			Properties		Ref
Permanent	Provisional	Named after	Date	Site	Discoverer(s)	Category	Diam.	Ref
450301	2004 QZ_{17}	—	August 19, 2004	Socorro	LINEAR	·	3.4 km	MPC · JPL
450302	2004 QF_{24}	—	August 27, 2004	Socorro	LINEAR	·	1.4 km	MPC · JPL
450303	2004 RA_{3}	—	September 6, 2004	Socorro	LINEAR	H	650 m	MPC · JPL
450304	2004 RA_{60}	—	September 8, 2004	Socorro	LINEAR	·	840 m	MPC · JPL
450305	2004 RK_{135}	—	September 7, 2004	Kitt Peak	Spacewatch	·	1.9 km	MPC · JPL
450306	2004 RS_{141}	—	September 8, 2004	Socorro	LINEAR	NYS	880 m	MPC · JPL
450307	2004 RX_{157}	—	September 10, 2004	Socorro	LINEAR	·	1.1 km	MPC · JPL
450308	2004 RG_{160}	—	September 10, 2004	Socorro	LINEAR	·	3.9 km	MPC · JPL
450309	2004 RF_{165}	—	September 7, 2004	Palomar	NEAT	H	560 m	MPC · JPL
450310	2004 RP_{175}	—	September 10, 2004	Socorro	LINEAR	·	920 m	MPC · JPL
450311	2004 RW_{189}	—	September 10, 2004	Socorro	LINEAR	·	3.3 km	MPC · JPL
450312	2004 RJ_{209}	—	September 11, 2004	Socorro	LINEAR	·	2.6 km	MPC · JPL
450313	2004 RG_{248}	—	September 12, 2004	Socorro	LINEAR	·	3.1 km	MPC · JPL
450314	2004 RE_{250}	—	September 10, 2004	Socorro	LINEAR	NYS	890 m	MPC · JPL
450315	2004 RM_{252}	—	September 15, 2004	Socorro	LINEAR	PHO	1.4 km	MPC · JPL
450316	2004 RN_{253}	—	September 6, 2004	Palomar	NEAT	·	2.3 km	MPC · JPL
450317	2004 RH_{334}	—	September 15, 2004	Anderson Mesa	LONEOS	·	1.0 km	MPC · JPL
450318	2004 ST_{1}	—	September 16, 2004	Kitt Peak	Spacewatch	·	2.0 km	MPC · JPL
450319	2004 SG_{18}	—	September 17, 2004	Anderson Mesa	LONEOS	·	2.3 km	MPC · JPL
450320	2004 SN_{19}	—	September 9, 2004	Kitt Peak	Spacewatch	·	3.1 km	MPC · JPL
450321	2004 SR_{28}	—	September 9, 2004	Socorro	LINEAR	·	930 m	MPC · JPL
450322	2004 SB_{51}	—	September 22, 2004	Kitt Peak	Spacewatch	·	1.1 km	MPC · JPL
450323	2004 TJ_{2}	—	October 4, 2004	Kitt Peak	Spacewatch	·	2.9 km	MPC · JPL
450324	2004 TK_{26}	—	October 4, 2004	Kitt Peak	Spacewatch	·	2.7 km	MPC · JPL
450325	2004 TK_{28}	—	October 4, 2004	Kitt Peak	Spacewatch	·	2.2 km	MPC · JPL
450326	2004 TW_{34}	—	September 17, 2004	Socorro	LINEAR	·	2.4 km	MPC · JPL
450327	2004 TQ_{45}	—	October 4, 2004	Kitt Peak	Spacewatch	·	1.0 km	MPC · JPL
450328	2004 TS_{49}	—	October 4, 2004	Kitt Peak	Spacewatch	V	650 m	MPC · JPL
450329	2004 TL_{56}	—	October 5, 2004	Kitt Peak	Spacewatch	·	1.4 km	MPC · JPL
450330	2004 TA_{72}	—	October 6, 2004	Kitt Peak	Spacewatch	·	1.8 km	MPC · JPL
450331	2004 TE_{92}	—	September 7, 2004	Kitt Peak	Spacewatch	·	2.7 km	MPC · JPL
450332	2004 TA_{94}	—	October 5, 2004	Kitt Peak	Spacewatch	·	2.1 km	MPC · JPL
450333	2004 TL_{107}	—	October 7, 2004	Kitt Peak	Spacewatch	·	970 m	MPC · JPL
450334	2004 TM_{107}	—	October 7, 2004	Kitt Peak	Spacewatch	·	2.1 km	MPC · JPL
450335	2004 TY_{142}	—	October 4, 2004	Kitt Peak	Spacewatch	PHO	1.3 km	MPC · JPL
450336	2004 TW_{151}	—	October 6, 2004	Kitt Peak	Spacewatch	NYS	970 m	MPC · JPL
450337	2004 TX_{155}	—	October 6, 2004	Kitt Peak	Spacewatch	MAS	530 m	MPC · JPL
450338	2004 TO_{165}	—	October 7, 2004	Kitt Peak	Spacewatch	·	830 m	MPC · JPL
450339	2004 TO_{176}	—	September 22, 2004	Socorro	LINEAR	·	2.9 km	MPC · JPL
450340	2004 TA_{191}	—	October 7, 2004	Kitt Peak	Spacewatch	MAS	630 m	MPC · JPL
450341	2004 TB_{202}	—	October 7, 2004	Kitt Peak	Spacewatch	HYG	2.6 km	MPC · JPL
450342	2004 TV_{207}	—	October 7, 2004	Kitt Peak	Spacewatch	·	2.0 km	MPC · JPL
450343	2004 TV_{225}	—	October 8, 2004	Kitt Peak	Spacewatch	·	1.8 km	MPC · JPL
450344	2004 TN_{273}	—	October 9, 2004	Kitt Peak	Spacewatch	·	2.8 km	MPC · JPL
450345	2004 TO_{276}	—	October 9, 2004	Kitt Peak	Spacewatch	THM	2.4 km	MPC · JPL
450346	2004 TD_{307}	—	October 10, 2004	Socorro	LINEAR	·	3.4 km	MPC · JPL
450347	2004 TK_{323}	—	October 11, 2004	Kitt Peak	Spacewatch	·	2.5 km	MPC · JPL
450348	2004 TA_{326}	—	October 14, 2004	Palomar	NEAT	·	2.8 km	MPC · JPL
450349	2004 VG_{4}	—	November 3, 2004	Kitt Peak	Spacewatch	(5651)	3.7 km	MPC · JPL
450350	2004 VT_{5}	—	November 3, 2004	Kitt Peak	Spacewatch	·	2.9 km	MPC · JPL
450351	2004 VQ_{11}	—	November 3, 2004	Palomar	NEAT	·	960 m	MPC · JPL
450352	2004 VM_{37}	—	November 4, 2004	Kitt Peak	Spacewatch	·	830 m	MPC · JPL
450353	2004 VU_{38}	—	October 7, 2004	Kitt Peak	Spacewatch	·	3.2 km	MPC · JPL
450354	2004 VN_{41}	—	October 23, 2004	Kitt Peak	Spacewatch	·	3.5 km	MPC · JPL
450355	2004 VU_{41}	—	October 10, 2004	Kitt Peak	Spacewatch	MAS	770 m	MPC · JPL
450356	2004 VB_{80}	—	November 3, 2004	Anderson Mesa	LONEOS	·	990 m	MPC · JPL
450357	2004 WV_{12}	—	November 19, 2004	Catalina	CSS	ERI	1.6 km	MPC · JPL
450358	2004 XM_{25}	—	December 9, 2004	Catalina	CSS	·	2.5 km	MPC · JPL
450359	2004 XN_{71}	—	December 12, 2004	Socorro	LINEAR	·	4.6 km	MPC · JPL
450360	2004 XE_{90}	—	December 11, 2004	Kitt Peak	Spacewatch	NYS	1.2 km	MPC · JPL
450361	2004 XV_{101}	—	December 9, 2004	Catalina	CSS	·	1.6 km	MPC · JPL
450362	2004 XP_{124}	—	December 10, 2004	Socorro	LINEAR	T_{j} (2.99)	4.0 km	MPC · JPL
450363	2004 YL_{15}	—	December 19, 2004	Mount Lemmon	Mount Lemmon Survey	·	1.3 km	MPC · JPL
450364	2005 AP_{24}	—	January 7, 2005	Catalina	CSS	·	3.0 km	MPC · JPL
450365	2005 AV_{39}	—	December 13, 2004	Kitt Peak	Spacewatch	·	3.1 km	MPC · JPL
450366	2005 AG_{43}	—	January 15, 2005	Socorro	LINEAR	·	1.1 km	MPC · JPL
450367	2005 CX_{5}	—	February 1, 2005	Kitt Peak	Spacewatch	T_{j} (2.97)	3.9 km	MPC · JPL
450368	2005 CK_{62}	—	February 9, 2005	Anderson Mesa	LONEOS	·	1.1 km	MPC · JPL
450369	2005 EA_{116}	—	March 4, 2005	Mount Lemmon	Mount Lemmon Survey	·	1.2 km	MPC · JPL
450370	2005 EG_{137}	—	March 9, 2005	Mount Lemmon	Mount Lemmon Survey	·	980 m	MPC · JPL
450371	2005 EF_{286}	—	March 2, 2005	Socorro	LINEAR	·	6.4 km	MPC · JPL
450372	2005 GD_{37}	—	April 2, 2005	Catalina	CSS	·	1.9 km	MPC · JPL
450373	2005 GL_{60}	—	April 4, 2005	Catalina	CSS	JUN	1.1 km	MPC · JPL
450374	2005 GB_{107}	—	March 8, 2005	Mount Lemmon	Mount Lemmon Survey	·	1.4 km	MPC · JPL
450375	2005 GU_{131}	—	April 10, 2005	Kitt Peak	Spacewatch	·	1.3 km	MPC · JPL
450376	2005 GN_{144}	—	April 10, 2005	Kitt Peak	Spacewatch	·	1.4 km	MPC · JPL
450377	2005 GB_{201}	—	April 4, 2005	Mount Lemmon	Mount Lemmon Survey	·	1.6 km	MPC · JPL
450378	2005 JG_{21}	—	May 4, 2005	Siding Spring	SSS	·	1.8 km	MPC · JPL
450379	2005 JQ_{97}	—	May 8, 2005	Kitt Peak	Spacewatch	·	1.4 km	MPC · JPL
450380	2005 JK_{118}	—	May 10, 2005	Mount Lemmon	Mount Lemmon Survey	·	3.1 km	MPC · JPL
450381	2005 JB_{151}	—	May 3, 2005	Kitt Peak	Spacewatch	·	1.3 km	MPC · JPL
450382	2005 JD_{185}	—	May 14, 2005	Kitt Peak	Spacewatch	·	2.3 km	MPC · JPL
450383	2005 LH_{4}	—	May 20, 2005	Mount Lemmon	Mount Lemmon Survey	·	2.0 km	MPC · JPL
450384	2005 LV_{18}	—	June 8, 2005	Kitt Peak	Spacewatch	·	1.4 km	MPC · JPL
450385	2005 MH_{48}	—	June 29, 2005	Kitt Peak	Spacewatch	·	1.7 km	MPC · JPL
450386	2005 NA_{23}	—	July 4, 2005	Kitt Peak	Spacewatch	·	2.1 km	MPC · JPL
450387	2005 NE_{31}	—	July 4, 2005	Mount Lemmon	Mount Lemmon Survey	·	2.6 km	MPC · JPL
450388	2005 NA_{41}	—	July 4, 2005	Kitt Peak	Spacewatch	·	1.5 km	MPC · JPL
450389	2005 OY_{21}	—	July 29, 2005	Palomar	NEAT	·	2.3 km	MPC · JPL
450390 Pitchcomment	2005 PN_{5}	Pitchcomment	August 8, 2005	Vicques	M. Ory	·	480 m	MPC · JPL
450391	2005 QC_{81}	—	August 29, 2005	Kitt Peak	Spacewatch	·	1.9 km	MPC · JPL
450392	2005 QE_{109}	—	August 27, 2005	Palomar	NEAT	·	1.9 km	MPC · JPL
450393	2005 QW_{138}	—	August 28, 2005	Kitt Peak	Spacewatch	DOR	2.2 km	MPC · JPL
450394	2005 QR_{180}	—	August 28, 2005	Kitt Peak	Spacewatch	·	620 m	MPC · JPL
450395	2005 SA_{18}	—	September 26, 2005	Kitt Peak	Spacewatch	·	1.6 km	MPC · JPL
450396	2005 SY_{63}	—	September 26, 2005	Kitt Peak	Spacewatch	·	3.7 km	MPC · JPL
450397	2005 SG_{80}	—	September 24, 2005	Kitt Peak	Spacewatch	KOR	1.3 km	MPC · JPL
450398	2005 SC_{141}	—	September 25, 2005	Kitt Peak	Spacewatch	KOR	1.3 km	MPC · JPL
450399	2005 SK_{166}	—	September 28, 2005	Palomar	NEAT	·	2.4 km	MPC · JPL
450400	2005 SU_{172}	—	September 29, 2005	Kitt Peak	Spacewatch	·	590 m	MPC · JPL

== 450401–450500 ==
back to top

Designation			Discovery			Properties		Ref
Permanent	Provisional	Named after	Date	Site	Discoverer(s)	Category	Diam.	Ref
450401	2005 SE_{207}	—	September 30, 2005	Mount Lemmon	Mount Lemmon Survey	·	1.2 km	MPC · JPL
450402	2005 SY_{209}	—	September 30, 2005	Palomar	NEAT	·	830 m	MPC · JPL
450403	2005 SJ_{227}	—	September 30, 2005	Kitt Peak	Spacewatch	·	1.7 km	MPC · JPL
450404	2005 SB_{232}	—	September 30, 2005	Mount Lemmon	Mount Lemmon Survey	·	1.9 km	MPC · JPL
450405	2005 SW_{265}	—	August 29, 2005	Socorro	LINEAR	·	610 m	MPC · JPL
450406	2005 SO_{278}	—	September 29, 2005	Catalina	CSS	BRA	1.7 km	MPC · JPL
450407	2005 TP_{22}	—	October 1, 2005	Mount Lemmon	Mount Lemmon Survey	·	1.4 km	MPC · JPL
450408	2005 TM_{46}	—	September 23, 2005	Kitt Peak	Spacewatch	·	640 m	MPC · JPL
450409	2005 TT_{51}	—	October 6, 2005	Mount Lemmon	Mount Lemmon Survey	·	640 m	MPC · JPL
450410	2005 TX_{102}	—	October 2, 2005	Mount Lemmon	Mount Lemmon Survey	KOR	1.2 km	MPC · JPL
450411	2005 TC_{106}	—	October 3, 2005	Catalina	CSS	·	2.7 km	MPC · JPL
450412	2005 TX_{117}	—	October 7, 2005	Kitt Peak	Spacewatch	KOR	980 m	MPC · JPL
450413	2005 TN_{120}	—	September 29, 2005	Mount Lemmon	Mount Lemmon Survey	·	480 m	MPC · JPL
450414	2005 TU_{121}	—	October 7, 2005	Kitt Peak	Spacewatch	·	740 m	MPC · JPL
450415	2005 TR_{142}	—	September 29, 2005	Kitt Peak	Spacewatch	·	590 m	MPC · JPL
450416	2005 TK_{146}	—	September 29, 2005	Kitt Peak	Spacewatch	·	730 m	MPC · JPL
450417	2005 TM_{154}	—	September 29, 2005	Kitt Peak	Spacewatch	·	1.5 km	MPC · JPL
450418	2005 TR_{184}	—	October 1, 2005	Kitt Peak	Spacewatch	KOR	1.1 km	MPC · JPL
450419	2005 TP_{188}	—	October 3, 2005	Catalina	CSS	·	940 m	MPC · JPL
450420	2005 UF_{12}	—	October 22, 2005	Kitt Peak	Spacewatch	·	690 m	MPC · JPL
450421	2005 UZ_{12}	—	October 22, 2005	Kitt Peak	Spacewatch	·	700 m	MPC · JPL
450422	2005 UM_{13}	—	October 2, 2005	Mount Lemmon	Mount Lemmon Survey	KOR	1.0 km	MPC · JPL
450423	2005 UX_{13}	—	September 24, 2005	Kitt Peak	Spacewatch	·	1.6 km	MPC · JPL
450424	2005 UC_{26}	—	October 1, 2005	Mount Lemmon	Mount Lemmon Survey	·	1.4 km	MPC · JPL
450425	2005 UM_{31}	—	October 24, 2005	Kitt Peak	Spacewatch	EOS	1.9 km	MPC · JPL
450426	2005 UA_{73}	—	October 23, 2005	Palomar	NEAT	H	610 m	MPC · JPL
450427	2005 UE_{95}	—	October 22, 2005	Kitt Peak	Spacewatch	·	1.6 km	MPC · JPL
450428	2005 UN_{101}	—	October 22, 2005	Kitt Peak	Spacewatch	·	2.1 km	MPC · JPL
450429	2005 UD_{105}	—	October 22, 2005	Kitt Peak	Spacewatch	·	1.3 km	MPC · JPL
450430	2005 UB_{182}	—	October 24, 2005	Kitt Peak	Spacewatch	·	2.1 km	MPC · JPL
450431	2005 UH_{200}	—	October 25, 2005	Kitt Peak	Spacewatch	·	600 m	MPC · JPL
450432	2005 UF_{202}	—	October 25, 2005	Kitt Peak	Spacewatch	·	650 m	MPC · JPL
450433	2005 UP_{208}	—	October 27, 2005	Kitt Peak	Spacewatch	·	580 m	MPC · JPL
450434	2005 UM_{213}	—	October 22, 2005	Palomar	NEAT	·	1.9 km	MPC · JPL
450435	2005 UN_{231}	—	October 25, 2005	Mount Lemmon	Mount Lemmon Survey	·	670 m	MPC · JPL
450436	2005 UC_{253}	—	October 27, 2005	Kitt Peak	Spacewatch	·	850 m	MPC · JPL
450437	2005 UV_{308}	—	October 28, 2005	Catalina	CSS	·	730 m	MPC · JPL
450438	2005 US_{325}	—	October 1, 2005	Kitt Peak	Spacewatch	·	1.6 km	MPC · JPL
450439	2005 UZ_{328}	—	October 1, 2005	Mount Lemmon	Mount Lemmon Survey	·	1.6 km	MPC · JPL
450440	2005 UC_{355}	—	October 29, 2005	Catalina	CSS	·	550 m	MPC · JPL
450441	2005 UD_{360}	—	October 25, 2005	Mount Lemmon	Mount Lemmon Survey	KOR	1.2 km	MPC · JPL
450442	2005 UH_{368}	—	October 22, 2005	Kitt Peak	Spacewatch	·	640 m	MPC · JPL
450443	2005 UY_{387}	—	October 26, 2005	Kitt Peak	Spacewatch	·	1.5 km	MPC · JPL
450444	2005 UY_{399}	—	October 25, 2005	Mount Lemmon	Mount Lemmon Survey	H	290 m	MPC · JPL
450445	2005 UT_{417}	—	October 25, 2005	Kitt Peak	Spacewatch	·	2.1 km	MPC · JPL
450446	2005 UN_{418}	—	October 25, 2005	Kitt Peak	Spacewatch	·	540 m	MPC · JPL
450447	2005 UP_{438}	—	October 28, 2005	Catalina	CSS	·	650 m	MPC · JPL
450448	2005 UP_{443}	—	October 7, 2005	Mount Lemmon	Mount Lemmon Survey	·	730 m	MPC · JPL
450449	2005 UQ_{445}	—	October 31, 2005	Mount Lemmon	Mount Lemmon Survey	·	3.0 km	MPC · JPL
450450	2005 UE_{453}	—	October 25, 2005	Kitt Peak	Spacewatch	·	470 m	MPC · JPL
450451	2005 UF_{454}	—	September 29, 2005	Catalina	CSS	BRA	1.7 km	MPC · JPL
450452	2005 UX_{470}	—	October 30, 2005	Kitt Peak	Spacewatch	·	1.6 km	MPC · JPL
450453	2005 UO_{477}	—	October 26, 2005	Kitt Peak	Spacewatch	·	620 m	MPC · JPL
450454	2005 UW_{478}	—	October 28, 2005	Kitt Peak	Spacewatch	·	570 m	MPC · JPL
450455	2005 UC_{510}	—	October 24, 2005	Kitt Peak	Spacewatch	V	600 m	MPC · JPL
450456	2005 UR_{525}	—	October 25, 2005	Mount Lemmon	Mount Lemmon Survey	·	610 m	MPC · JPL
450457	2005 UG_{529}	—	October 24, 2005	Kitt Peak	Spacewatch	·	1.4 km	MPC · JPL
450458	2005 VE_{46}	—	November 4, 2005	Mount Lemmon	Mount Lemmon Survey	·	600 m	MPC · JPL
450459	2005 VT_{67}	—	October 26, 2005	Kitt Peak	Spacewatch	·	1.6 km	MPC · JPL
450460	2005 WY_{9}	—	November 1, 2005	Mount Lemmon	Mount Lemmon Survey	·	710 m	MPC · JPL
450461	2005 WS_{15}	—	November 22, 2005	Kitt Peak	Spacewatch	·	570 m	MPC · JPL
450462	2005 WS_{25}	—	November 6, 2005	Mount Lemmon	Mount Lemmon Survey	BRA	1.5 km	MPC · JPL
450463	2005 WC_{28}	—	November 21, 2005	Kitt Peak	Spacewatch	·	1.9 km	MPC · JPL
450464	2005 WN_{28}	—	November 21, 2005	Kitt Peak	Spacewatch	·	570 m	MPC · JPL
450465	2005 WM_{100}	—	November 28, 2005	Mount Lemmon	Mount Lemmon Survey	·	890 m	MPC · JPL
450466	2005 WK_{110}	—	October 29, 2005	Mount Lemmon	Mount Lemmon Survey	·	560 m	MPC · JPL
450467	2005 WF_{125}	—	November 25, 2005	Mount Lemmon	Mount Lemmon Survey	·	570 m	MPC · JPL
450468	2005 WW_{134}	—	November 25, 2005	Mount Lemmon	Mount Lemmon Survey	EOS	2.0 km	MPC · JPL
450469	2005 WA_{135}	—	November 25, 2005	Mount Lemmon	Mount Lemmon Survey	EOS	1.7 km	MPC · JPL
450470	2005 WN_{135}	—	November 25, 2005	Mount Lemmon	Mount Lemmon Survey	·	2.8 km	MPC · JPL
450471	2005 WS_{139}	—	November 26, 2005	Mount Lemmon	Mount Lemmon Survey	·	1.5 km	MPC · JPL
450472	2005 WB_{145}	—	November 25, 2005	Kitt Peak	Spacewatch	·	1.0 km	MPC · JPL
450473	2005 WZ_{154}	—	November 29, 2005	Kitt Peak	Spacewatch	·	1.6 km	MPC · JPL
450474	2005 WO_{195}	—	November 30, 2005	Catalina	CSS	·	7.1 km	MPC · JPL
450475	2005 WG_{196}	—	November 29, 2005	Mount Lemmon	Mount Lemmon Survey	·	710 m	MPC · JPL
450476	2005 XD_{10}	—	December 1, 2005	Kitt Peak	Spacewatch	·	640 m	MPC · JPL
450477	2005 XJ_{18}	—	December 1, 2005	Kitt Peak	Spacewatch	·	740 m	MPC · JPL
450478	2005 XO_{23}	—	December 2, 2005	Mount Lemmon	Mount Lemmon Survey	EOS	2.0 km	MPC · JPL
450479	2005 XP_{26}	—	October 29, 2005	Mount Lemmon	Mount Lemmon Survey	·	2.3 km	MPC · JPL
450480	2005 XO_{52}	—	December 2, 2005	Kitt Peak	Spacewatch	·	2.2 km	MPC · JPL
450481	2005 XT_{60}	—	December 4, 2005	Kitt Peak	Spacewatch	·	610 m	MPC · JPL
450482	2005 XR_{74}	—	December 6, 2005	Kitt Peak	Spacewatch	·	3.5 km	MPC · JPL
450483	2005 YN_{7}	—	December 22, 2005	Kitt Peak	Spacewatch	·	730 m	MPC · JPL
450484	2005 YO_{28}	—	December 22, 2005	Kitt Peak	Spacewatch	·	550 m	MPC · JPL
450485	2005 YK_{58}	—	December 24, 2005	Kitt Peak	Spacewatch	·	2.1 km	MPC · JPL
450486	2005 YL_{62}	—	December 24, 2005	Kitt Peak	Spacewatch	THM	1.7 km	MPC · JPL
450487	2005 YD_{64}	—	December 24, 2005	Kitt Peak	Spacewatch	·	2.8 km	MPC · JPL
450488	2005 YJ_{67}	—	December 26, 2005	Kitt Peak	Spacewatch	·	680 m	MPC · JPL
450489	2005 YC_{93}	—	December 27, 2005	Kitt Peak	Spacewatch	·	710 m	MPC · JPL
450490	2005 YB_{105}	—	November 1, 2005	Mount Lemmon	Mount Lemmon Survey	EOS	2.0 km	MPC · JPL
450491	2005 YT_{106}	—	December 4, 2005	Mount Lemmon	Mount Lemmon Survey	·	1.4 km	MPC · JPL
450492	2005 YG_{110}	—	December 25, 2005	Kitt Peak	Spacewatch	·	590 m	MPC · JPL
450493	2005 YL_{125}	—	December 26, 2005	Kitt Peak	Spacewatch	·	490 m	MPC · JPL
450494	2005 YC_{132}	—	December 25, 2005	Mount Lemmon	Mount Lemmon Survey	EMA	3.0 km	MPC · JPL
450495	2005 YB_{142}	—	December 28, 2005	Mount Lemmon	Mount Lemmon Survey	·	1.4 km	MPC · JPL
450496	2005 YE_{142}	—	December 28, 2005	Mount Lemmon	Mount Lemmon Survey	EOS	2.7 km	MPC · JPL
450497	2005 YP_{168}	—	November 30, 2005	Mount Lemmon	Mount Lemmon Survey	EMA	3.1 km	MPC · JPL
450498	2005 YE_{176}	—	December 22, 2005	Kitt Peak	Spacewatch	V	700 m	MPC · JPL
450499	2005 YO_{188}	—	December 28, 2005	Mount Lemmon	Mount Lemmon Survey	·	1.3 km	MPC · JPL
450500	2005 YM_{192}	—	December 30, 2005	Kitt Peak	Spacewatch	·	3.2 km	MPC · JPL

== 450501–450600 ==
back to top

Designation			Discovery			Properties		Ref
Permanent	Provisional	Named after	Date	Site	Discoverer(s)	Category	Diam.	Ref
450501	2005 YG_{204}	—	December 25, 2005	Mount Lemmon	Mount Lemmon Survey	L5 · (17492)	12 km	MPC · JPL
450502	2005 YP_{238}	—	December 29, 2005	Kitt Peak	Spacewatch	·	740 m	MPC · JPL
450503	2005 YE_{272}	—	December 29, 2005	Kitt Peak	Spacewatch	·	500 m	MPC · JPL
450504	2005 YF_{277}	—	December 25, 2005	Kitt Peak	Spacewatch	EOS	1.5 km	MPC · JPL
450505	2005 YD_{279}	—	December 25, 2005	Mount Lemmon	Mount Lemmon Survey	·	3.4 km	MPC · JPL
450506	2005 YJ_{291}	—	December 26, 2005	Mount Lemmon	Mount Lemmon Survey	·	2.3 km	MPC · JPL
450507	2006 AE_{13}	—	December 28, 2005	Kitt Peak	Spacewatch	·	1.8 km	MPC · JPL
450508	2006 AS_{19}	—	January 5, 2006	Kitt Peak	Spacewatch	·	770 m	MPC · JPL
450509	2006 AX_{23}	—	January 4, 2006	Mount Lemmon	Mount Lemmon Survey	H	630 m	MPC · JPL
450510	2006 AC_{28}	—	January 5, 2006	Mount Lemmon	Mount Lemmon Survey	H	720 m	MPC · JPL
450511	2006 AD_{35}	—	December 26, 2005	Mount Lemmon	Mount Lemmon Survey	·	2.3 km	MPC · JPL
450512	2006 AJ_{59}	—	December 10, 2005	Kitt Peak	Spacewatch	EOS	1.8 km	MPC · JPL
450513	2006 AC_{65}	—	December 30, 2005	Kitt Peak	Spacewatch	·	1.7 km	MPC · JPL
450514	2006 AL_{76}	—	January 5, 2006	Kitt Peak	Spacewatch	·	450 m	MPC · JPL
450515	2006 AW_{88}	—	December 2, 2005	Mount Lemmon	Mount Lemmon Survey	EOS	1.9 km	MPC · JPL
450516	2006 AB_{101}	—	January 5, 2006	Mount Lemmon	Mount Lemmon Survey	·	2.4 km	MPC · JPL
450517	2006 AG_{101}	—	January 7, 2006	Mount Lemmon	Mount Lemmon Survey	·	700 m	MPC · JPL
450518	2006 BD_{7}	—	January 6, 2006	Mount Lemmon	Mount Lemmon Survey	·	1.8 km	MPC · JPL
450519	2006 BC_{21}	—	January 7, 2006	Mount Lemmon	Mount Lemmon Survey	·	2.4 km	MPC · JPL
450520	2006 BB_{23}	—	December 25, 2005	Kitt Peak	Spacewatch	EOS	2.1 km	MPC · JPL
450521	2006 BQ_{57}	—	January 23, 2006	Kitt Peak	Spacewatch	·	1.2 km	MPC · JPL
450522	2006 BJ_{66}	—	January 23, 2006	Kitt Peak	Spacewatch	THM	2.4 km	MPC · JPL
450523	2006 BB_{67}	—	January 23, 2006	Kitt Peak	Spacewatch	·	500 m	MPC · JPL
450524	2006 BP_{67}	—	January 23, 2006	Kitt Peak	Spacewatch	·	3.6 km	MPC · JPL
450525	2006 BV_{71}	—	January 23, 2006	Kitt Peak	Spacewatch	·	800 m	MPC · JPL
450526	2006 BK_{76}	—	January 23, 2006	Kitt Peak	Spacewatch	EMA	3.1 km	MPC · JPL
450527	2006 BX_{81}	—	January 23, 2006	Kitt Peak	Spacewatch	·	800 m	MPC · JPL
450528	2006 BD_{107}	—	December 28, 2005	Mount Lemmon	Mount Lemmon Survey	·	1.9 km	MPC · JPL
450529	2006 BK_{108}	—	January 25, 2006	Kitt Peak	Spacewatch	·	2.3 km	MPC · JPL
450530	2006 BY_{109}	—	January 25, 2006	Kitt Peak	Spacewatch	·	1.0 km	MPC · JPL
450531	2006 BW_{111}	—	January 25, 2006	Kitt Peak	Spacewatch	·	480 m	MPC · JPL
450532	2006 BX_{120}	—	January 21, 2006	Kitt Peak	Spacewatch	·	2.6 km	MPC · JPL
450533	2006 BR_{129}	—	January 26, 2006	Mount Lemmon	Mount Lemmon Survey	·	800 m	MPC · JPL
450534	2006 BD_{135}	—	January 7, 2006	Mount Lemmon	Mount Lemmon Survey	·	3.0 km	MPC · JPL
450535	2006 BW_{154}	—	January 7, 2006	Mount Lemmon	Mount Lemmon Survey	·	3.1 km	MPC · JPL
450536	2006 BM_{162}	—	January 26, 2006	Mount Lemmon	Mount Lemmon Survey	·	660 m	MPC · JPL
450537	2006 BW_{168}	—	January 26, 2006	Mount Lemmon	Mount Lemmon Survey	·	2.5 km	MPC · JPL
450538	2006 BE_{200}	—	January 30, 2006	Kitt Peak	Spacewatch	·	2.9 km	MPC · JPL
450539	2006 BT_{202}	—	January 31, 2006	Kitt Peak	Spacewatch	·	2.3 km	MPC · JPL
450540	2006 BP_{228}	—	January 23, 2006	Kitt Peak	Spacewatch	·	670 m	MPC · JPL
450541	2006 BF_{265}	—	January 31, 2006	Kitt Peak	Spacewatch	NYS	830 m	MPC · JPL
450542	2006 BT_{276}	—	January 23, 2006	Kitt Peak	Spacewatch	·	3.1 km	MPC · JPL
450543	2006 BH_{277}	—	January 30, 2006	Kitt Peak	Spacewatch	·	840 m	MPC · JPL
450544	2006 BJ_{280}	—	January 27, 2006	Kitt Peak	Spacewatch	·	2.3 km	MPC · JPL
450545	2006 CA_{63}	—	February 4, 2006	Catalina	CSS	·	3.4 km	MPC · JPL
450546	2006 DT_{20}	—	February 20, 2006	Kitt Peak	Spacewatch	·	2.4 km	MPC · JPL
450547	2006 DM_{68}	—	February 22, 2006	Catalina	CSS	H	690 m	MPC · JPL
450548	2006 DP_{68}	—	February 1, 2006	Catalina	CSS	·	4.0 km	MPC · JPL
450549	2006 DK_{104}	—	February 25, 2006	Kitt Peak	Spacewatch	NYS	580 m	MPC · JPL
450550	2006 DR_{109}	—	February 25, 2006	Kitt Peak	Spacewatch	·	950 m	MPC · JPL
450551	2006 DY_{110}	—	February 25, 2006	Mount Lemmon	Mount Lemmon Survey	·	3.3 km	MPC · JPL
450552	2006 DD_{136}	—	February 25, 2006	Kitt Peak	Spacewatch	·	1.3 km	MPC · JPL
450553	2006 DN_{136}	—	February 25, 2006	Kitt Peak	Spacewatch	·	1.1 km	MPC · JPL
450554	2006 DT_{138}	—	February 25, 2006	Kitt Peak	Spacewatch	NYS	780 m	MPC · JPL
450555	2006 DN_{171}	—	February 27, 2006	Kitt Peak	Spacewatch	VER	2.5 km	MPC · JPL
450556	2006 EX_{15}	—	February 24, 2006	Kitt Peak	Spacewatch	·	3.0 km	MPC · JPL
450557	2006 EG_{22}	—	January 26, 2006	Kitt Peak	Spacewatch	THM	2.2 km	MPC · JPL
450558	2006 EM_{49}	—	March 4, 2006	Kitt Peak	Spacewatch	·	870 m	MPC · JPL
450559	2006 EB_{73}	—	March 4, 2006	Kitt Peak	Spacewatch	·	3.0 km	MPC · JPL
450560	2006 FK_{5}	—	March 23, 2006	Kitt Peak	Spacewatch	·	1.4 km	MPC · JPL
450561	2006 FS_{10}	—	March 2, 2006	Kitt Peak	Spacewatch	·	1.1 km	MPC · JPL
450562	2006 FQ_{28}	—	March 24, 2006	Mount Lemmon	Mount Lemmon Survey	·	910 m	MPC · JPL
450563	2006 FN_{36}	—	March 19, 2006	Siding Spring	SSS	·	1.1 km	MPC · JPL
450564	2006 FX_{43}	—	March 3, 2006	Catalina	CSS	·	2.3 km	MPC · JPL
450565	2006 FM_{46}	—	March 26, 2006	Siding Spring	SSS	T_{j} (2.96)	2.9 km	MPC · JPL
450566	2006 FJ_{50}	—	March 25, 2006	Catalina	CSS	·	3.7 km	MPC · JPL
450567	2006 GB_{8}	—	March 24, 2006	Kitt Peak	Spacewatch	·	1.0 km	MPC · JPL
450568	2006 GK_{20}	—	April 2, 2006	Kitt Peak	Spacewatch	·	1.3 km	MPC · JPL
450569	2006 HL_{1}	—	April 18, 2006	Kitt Peak	Spacewatch	·	1.2 km	MPC · JPL
450570	2006 HE_{53}	—	April 19, 2006	Socorro	LINEAR	·	4.3 km	MPC · JPL
450571	2006 JH_{35}	—	April 26, 2006	Kitt Peak	Spacewatch	·	1.1 km	MPC · JPL
450572	2006 KA_{28}	—	May 8, 2006	Kitt Peak	Spacewatch	·	1.4 km	MPC · JPL
450573	2006 MG_{9}	—	June 19, 2006	Mount Lemmon	Mount Lemmon Survey	JUN	970 m	MPC · JPL
450574	2006 OU_{14}	—	July 29, 2006	Marly	Observatoire Naef	·	1.4 km	MPC · JPL
450575	2006 PD_{3}	—	August 12, 2006	Palomar	NEAT	·	1.3 km	MPC · JPL
450576	2006 PF_{3}	—	August 12, 2006	Palomar	NEAT	ADE	1.9 km	MPC · JPL
450577	2006 PY_{8}	—	August 13, 2006	Palomar	NEAT	·	1.4 km	MPC · JPL
450578	2006 QE_{15}	—	June 19, 2006	Mount Lemmon	Mount Lemmon Survey	·	1.4 km	MPC · JPL
450579	2006 QA_{39}	—	August 19, 2006	Anderson Mesa	LONEOS	·	1.3 km	MPC · JPL
450580	2006 QU_{54}	—	August 18, 2006	Anderson Mesa	LONEOS	·	2.6 km	MPC · JPL
450581	2006 QK_{61}	—	August 22, 2006	Palomar	NEAT	·	1.4 km	MPC · JPL
450582	2006 QD_{93}	—	August 16, 2006	Palomar	NEAT	·	1.4 km	MPC · JPL
450583	2006 QC_{101}	—	August 26, 2006	Siding Spring	SSS	·	1.2 km	MPC · JPL
450584	2006 QX_{108}	—	August 28, 2006	Kitt Peak	Spacewatch	·	1.2 km	MPC · JPL
450585	2006 QT_{110}	—	August 19, 2006	Kitt Peak	Spacewatch	·	1.4 km	MPC · JPL
450586	2006 QP_{116}	—	August 24, 2006	Socorro	LINEAR	·	1.5 km	MPC · JPL
450587	2006 QH_{153}	—	August 19, 2006	Kitt Peak	Spacewatch	·	1.6 km	MPC · JPL
450588	2006 RX_{15}	—	September 14, 2006	Catalina	CSS	·	1.9 km	MPC · JPL
450589	2006 RB_{32}	—	September 15, 2006	Kitt Peak	Spacewatch	EUN	1.1 km	MPC · JPL
450590	2006 RH_{33}	—	August 28, 2006	Catalina	CSS	·	1.4 km	MPC · JPL
450591	2006 RL_{43}	—	September 14, 2006	Kitt Peak	Spacewatch	·	1.2 km	MPC · JPL
450592	2006 RU_{48}	—	September 14, 2006	Kitt Peak	Spacewatch	·	1.4 km	MPC · JPL
450593	2006 RJ_{55}	—	September 14, 2006	Kitt Peak	Spacewatch	·	1.6 km	MPC · JPL
450594	2006 RG_{74}	—	September 15, 2006	Kitt Peak	Spacewatch	·	1.9 km	MPC · JPL
450595	2006 RA_{78}	—	September 15, 2006	Kitt Peak	Spacewatch	NEM	2.0 km	MPC · JPL
450596	2006 RE_{91}	—	September 15, 2006	Kitt Peak	Spacewatch	·	1.6 km	MPC · JPL
450597	2006 RK_{91}	—	September 15, 2006	Kitt Peak	Spacewatch	·	1.6 km	MPC · JPL
450598	2006 RZ_{96}	—	September 15, 2006	Kitt Peak	Spacewatch	·	1.4 km	MPC · JPL
450599	2006 SF	—	June 21, 2006	Catalina	CSS	·	1.8 km	MPC · JPL
450600	2006 SX_{2}	—	September 16, 2006	Catalina	CSS	·	2.6 km	MPC · JPL

== 450601–450700 ==
back to top

Designation			Discovery			Properties		Ref
Permanent	Provisional	Named after	Date	Site	Discoverer(s)	Category	Diam.	Ref
450601	2006 SV_{31}	—	September 17, 2006	Kitt Peak	Spacewatch	·	1.6 km	MPC · JPL
450602	2006 SA_{76}	—	September 19, 2006	Kitt Peak	Spacewatch	·	2.5 km	MPC · JPL
450603	2006 SH_{94}	—	September 18, 2006	Kitt Peak	Spacewatch	·	1.7 km	MPC · JPL
450604	2006 SO_{102}	—	September 19, 2006	Kitt Peak	Spacewatch	EUN	1.0 km	MPC · JPL
450605	2006 SQ_{106}	—	September 19, 2006	Kitt Peak	Spacewatch	·	1.2 km	MPC · JPL
450606	2006 SP_{122}	—	September 19, 2006	Catalina	CSS	·	2.5 km	MPC · JPL
450607	2006 SF_{188}	—	September 26, 2006	Kitt Peak	Spacewatch	JUN	830 m	MPC · JPL
450608	2006 SR_{241}	—	September 26, 2006	Mount Lemmon	Mount Lemmon Survey	·	1.5 km	MPC · JPL
450609	2006 SS_{268}	—	September 26, 2006	Kitt Peak	Spacewatch	·	1.8 km	MPC · JPL
450610	2006 SM_{269}	—	September 26, 2006	Mount Lemmon	Mount Lemmon Survey	·	2.0 km	MPC · JPL
450611	2006 SH_{277}	—	September 15, 2006	Kitt Peak	Spacewatch	·	1.5 km	MPC · JPL
450612	2006 SK_{282}	—	August 29, 2006	Kitt Peak	Spacewatch	·	1.7 km	MPC · JPL
450613	2006 SV_{285}	—	September 30, 2006	Kitt Peak	Spacewatch	·	1.7 km	MPC · JPL
450614	2006 SV_{318}	—	September 27, 2006	Kitt Peak	Spacewatch	·	1.4 km	MPC · JPL
450615	2006 SW_{324}	—	September 27, 2006	Kitt Peak	Spacewatch	·	1.4 km	MPC · JPL
450616	2006 SU_{365}	—	September 30, 2006	Mount Lemmon	Mount Lemmon Survey	·	2.2 km	MPC · JPL
450617	2006 SO_{381}	—	September 28, 2006	Apache Point	A. C. Becker	·	1.5 km	MPC · JPL
450618	2006 SB_{384}	—	September 29, 2006	Apache Point	A. C. Becker	·	1.4 km	MPC · JPL
450619	2006 SD_{390}	—	September 30, 2006	Apache Point	A. C. Becker	EUN	1.1 km	MPC · JPL
450620	2006 SO_{397}	—	September 25, 2006	Kitt Peak	Spacewatch	·	1.5 km	MPC · JPL
450621	2006 SN_{399}	—	September 17, 2006	Kitt Peak	Spacewatch	·	2.0 km	MPC · JPL
450622	2006 SG_{403}	—	September 27, 2006	Mount Lemmon	Mount Lemmon Survey	·	1.6 km	MPC · JPL
450623	2006 SN_{411}	—	September 17, 2006	Catalina	CSS	EUN	1.1 km	MPC · JPL
450624	2006 SE_{412}	—	September 26, 2006	Kitt Peak	Spacewatch	·	1.0 km	MPC · JPL
450625	2006 TY_{12}	—	October 10, 2006	Palomar	NEAT	·	1.9 km	MPC · JPL
450626	2006 TA_{24}	—	October 11, 2006	Kitt Peak	Spacewatch	·	1.7 km	MPC · JPL
450627	2006 TP_{35}	—	October 12, 2006	Kitt Peak	Spacewatch	·	1.3 km	MPC · JPL
450628	2006 TW_{55}	—	October 12, 2006	Palomar	NEAT	·	2.0 km	MPC · JPL
450629	2006 TZ_{63}	—	September 29, 2006	Anderson Mesa	LONEOS	·	1.7 km	MPC · JPL
450630	2006 TJ_{86}	—	October 13, 2006	Kitt Peak	Spacewatch	HOF	2.3 km	MPC · JPL
450631	2006 TM_{95}	—	September 28, 2006	Catalina	CSS	T_{j} (2.96)	2.5 km	MPC · JPL
450632	2006 TU_{98}	—	October 15, 2006	Kitt Peak	Spacewatch	·	1.5 km	MPC · JPL
450633	2006 TB_{122}	—	October 13, 2006	Kitt Peak	Spacewatch	·	1.9 km	MPC · JPL
450634	2006 TM_{125}	—	October 13, 2006	Kitt Peak	Spacewatch	·	1.6 km	MPC · JPL
450635	2006 TZ_{125}	—	October 2, 2006	Mount Lemmon	Mount Lemmon Survey	·	1.4 km	MPC · JPL
450636	2006 TQ_{127}	—	October 4, 2006	Mount Lemmon	Mount Lemmon Survey	·	1.6 km	MPC · JPL
450637	2006 UU_{5}	—	September 30, 2006	Mount Lemmon	Mount Lemmon Survey	·	1.6 km	MPC · JPL
450638	2006 UE_{7}	—	October 16, 2006	Catalina	CSS	·	2.5 km	MPC · JPL
450639	2006 UB_{8}	—	October 16, 2006	Catalina	CSS	JUN	1.0 km	MPC · JPL
450640	2006 UG_{19}	—	September 25, 2006	Kitt Peak	Spacewatch	·	1.6 km	MPC · JPL
450641	2006 UG_{21}	—	September 25, 2006	Kitt Peak	Spacewatch	·	1.3 km	MPC · JPL
450642	2006 UY_{22}	—	October 16, 2006	Mount Lemmon	Mount Lemmon Survey	·	1.6 km	MPC · JPL
450643	2006 UT_{37}	—	October 16, 2006	Kitt Peak	Spacewatch	·	1.5 km	MPC · JPL
450644	2006 UD_{44}	—	October 16, 2006	Kitt Peak	Spacewatch	·	1.0 km	MPC · JPL
450645	2006 UT_{44}	—	October 16, 2006	Kitt Peak	Spacewatch	·	1.7 km	MPC · JPL
450646	2006 UM_{46}	—	September 30, 2006	Mount Lemmon	Mount Lemmon Survey	EUN	1.4 km	MPC · JPL
450647	2006 US_{59}	—	October 19, 2006	Catalina	CSS	JUN	3.5 km	MPC · JPL
450648	2006 UC_{63}	—	October 21, 2006	Kitt Peak	Spacewatch	AMO · slow	440 m	MPC · JPL
450649	2006 UY_{64}	—	October 25, 2006	Siding Spring	SSS	ATE	460 m	MPC · JPL
450650	2006 UT_{77}	—	October 17, 2006	Kitt Peak	Spacewatch	·	1.6 km	MPC · JPL
450651	2006 UJ_{95}	—	October 18, 2006	Kitt Peak	Spacewatch	·	1.5 km	MPC · JPL
450652	2006 UM_{99}	—	October 3, 2006	Mount Lemmon	Mount Lemmon Survey	·	1.8 km	MPC · JPL
450653	2006 UY_{103}	—	September 30, 2006	Mount Lemmon	Mount Lemmon Survey	·	1.6 km	MPC · JPL
450654	2006 UV_{129}	—	October 19, 2006	Kitt Peak	Spacewatch	JUN	1.0 km	MPC · JPL
450655	2006 UL_{142}	—	October 19, 2006	Kitt Peak	Spacewatch	·	2.3 km	MPC · JPL
450656	2006 UJ_{176}	—	October 16, 2006	Catalina	CSS	·	1.7 km	MPC · JPL
450657	2006 UX_{187}	—	September 17, 2006	Catalina	CSS	·	2.0 km	MPC · JPL
450658	2006 UD_{197}	—	October 20, 2006	Kitt Peak	Spacewatch	·	1.4 km	MPC · JPL
450659	2006 UX_{208}	—	October 2, 2006	Mount Lemmon	Mount Lemmon Survey	·	2.3 km	MPC · JPL
450660	2006 UY_{208}	—	October 23, 2006	Kitt Peak	Spacewatch	·	1.3 km	MPC · JPL
450661	2006 UT_{209}	—	October 23, 2006	Kitt Peak	Spacewatch	·	1.9 km	MPC · JPL
450662	2006 US_{213}	—	October 23, 2006	Kitt Peak	Spacewatch	·	1.5 km	MPC · JPL
450663	2006 UH_{237}	—	September 26, 2006	Mount Lemmon	Mount Lemmon Survey	·	1.4 km	MPC · JPL
450664	2006 UE_{239}	—	October 23, 2006	Kitt Peak	Spacewatch	·	2.5 km	MPC · JPL
450665	2006 UO_{259}	—	September 18, 2006	Kitt Peak	Spacewatch	·	1.4 km	MPC · JPL
450666	2006 UW_{263}	—	September 30, 2006	Kitt Peak	Spacewatch	·	1.5 km	MPC · JPL
450667	2006 UE_{266}	—	October 27, 2006	Catalina	CSS	·	1.9 km	MPC · JPL
450668	2006 US_{270}	—	October 27, 2006	Mount Lemmon	Mount Lemmon Survey	AST	1.5 km	MPC · JPL
450669	2006 UM_{273}	—	October 27, 2006	Kitt Peak	Spacewatch	HOF	2.6 km	MPC · JPL
450670	2006 UZ_{337}	—	October 22, 2006	Kitt Peak	Spacewatch	·	2.5 km	MPC · JPL
450671	2006 VZ_{4}	—	October 17, 2006	Catalina	CSS	·	1.9 km	MPC · JPL
450672	2006 VW_{5}	—	November 10, 2006	Kitt Peak	Spacewatch	·	2.0 km	MPC · JPL
450673	2006 VR_{7}	—	November 10, 2006	Kitt Peak	Spacewatch	·	1.9 km	MPC · JPL
450674	2006 VD_{19}	—	November 9, 2006	Kitt Peak	Spacewatch	·	1.9 km	MPC · JPL
450675	2006 VX_{19}	—	November 9, 2006	Kitt Peak	Spacewatch	·	2.0 km	MPC · JPL
450676	2006 VB_{35}	—	November 11, 2006	Mount Lemmon	Mount Lemmon Survey	·	1.6 km	MPC · JPL
450677	2006 VA_{41}	—	October 20, 2006	Kitt Peak	Spacewatch	·	1.7 km	MPC · JPL
450678	2006 VU_{45}	—	October 27, 2006	Mount Lemmon	Mount Lemmon Survey	·	1.8 km	MPC · JPL
450679	2006 VE_{53}	—	November 11, 2006	Kitt Peak	Spacewatch	·	1.6 km	MPC · JPL
450680	2006 VO_{53}	—	November 11, 2006	Kitt Peak	Spacewatch	·	2.0 km	MPC · JPL
450681	2006 VJ_{64}	—	November 11, 2006	Kitt Peak	Spacewatch	·	2.0 km	MPC · JPL
450682	2006 VO_{67}	—	November 11, 2006	Kitt Peak	Spacewatch	·	1.4 km	MPC · JPL
450683	2006 VU_{92}	—	November 15, 2006	Kitt Peak	Spacewatch	NEM	2.0 km	MPC · JPL
450684	2006 VA_{94}	—	November 10, 2006	Kitt Peak	Spacewatch	·	2.8 km	MPC · JPL
450685	2006 VH_{99}	—	October 18, 2006	Kitt Peak	Spacewatch	AEO	1.0 km	MPC · JPL
450686	2006 VB_{123}	—	November 14, 2006	Kitt Peak	Spacewatch	·	2.4 km	MPC · JPL
450687	2006 VK_{132}	—	November 15, 2006	Kitt Peak	Spacewatch	AGN	970 m	MPC · JPL
450688	2006 VT_{173}	—	November 15, 2006	Kitt Peak	Spacewatch	AST	1.3 km	MPC · JPL
450689	2006 WO	—	November 16, 2006	Las Cruces	Dixon, D. S.	·	2.1 km	MPC · JPL
450690	2006 WP	—	November 17, 2006	Vail-Jarnac	Jarnac	·	2.2 km	MPC · JPL
450691	2006 WX_{13}	—	November 16, 2006	Mount Lemmon	Mount Lemmon Survey	·	2.7 km	MPC · JPL
450692	2006 WJ_{61}	—	November 2, 2006	Catalina	CSS	·	2.1 km	MPC · JPL
450693	2006 WJ_{79}	—	October 20, 2006	Mount Lemmon	Mount Lemmon Survey	AGN	1.2 km	MPC · JPL
450694	2006 WY_{83}	—	September 28, 2006	Mount Lemmon	Mount Lemmon Survey	·	2.1 km	MPC · JPL
450695	2006 WO_{87}	—	October 23, 2006	Mount Lemmon	Mount Lemmon Survey	·	1.9 km	MPC · JPL
450696	2006 WT_{94}	—	November 19, 2006	Kitt Peak	Spacewatch	·	1.5 km	MPC · JPL
450697	2006 WW_{94}	—	November 19, 2006	Kitt Peak	Spacewatch	·	1.4 km	MPC · JPL
450698	2006 WZ_{109}	—	November 19, 2006	Kitt Peak	Spacewatch	·	1.8 km	MPC · JPL
450699	2006 WA_{130}	—	November 1, 2006	Kitt Peak	Spacewatch	WIT	850 m	MPC · JPL
450700	2006 WY_{141}	—	November 20, 2006	Kitt Peak	Spacewatch	·	2.5 km	MPC · JPL

== 450701–450800 ==
back to top

Designation			Discovery			Properties		Ref
Permanent	Provisional	Named after	Date	Site	Discoverer(s)	Category	Diam.	Ref
450701	2006 WL_{142}	—	October 22, 2006	Mount Lemmon	Mount Lemmon Survey	·	1.8 km	MPC · JPL
450702	2006 WK_{161}	—	November 23, 2006	Kitt Peak	Spacewatch	·	2.1 km	MPC · JPL
450703	2006 WT_{167}	—	November 23, 2006	Kitt Peak	Spacewatch	·	2.8 km	MPC · JPL
450704	2006 WX_{176}	—	November 11, 2006	Mount Lemmon	Mount Lemmon Survey	·	1.4 km	MPC · JPL
450705	2006 WW_{180}	—	November 24, 2006	Mount Lemmon	Mount Lemmon Survey	HOF	2.1 km	MPC · JPL
450706	2006 WG_{199}	—	November 16, 2006	Kitt Peak	Spacewatch	DOR	3.7 km	MPC · JPL
450707	2006 WC_{204}	—	November 18, 2006	Kitt Peak	Spacewatch	GEF	1.3 km	MPC · JPL
450708	2006 XU_{22}	—	December 12, 2006	Kitt Peak	Spacewatch	·	2.2 km	MPC · JPL
450709	2006 YB_{31}	—	December 10, 2006	Kitt Peak	Spacewatch	BRA	1.9 km	MPC · JPL
450710	2006 YS_{42}	—	December 23, 2006	Catalina	CSS	·	1.8 km	MPC · JPL
450711	2007 AL_{29}	—	January 10, 2007	Kitt Peak	Spacewatch	·	3.8 km	MPC · JPL
450712	2007 BL_{11}	—	January 17, 2007	Palomar	NEAT	·	1.7 km	MPC · JPL
450713	2007 BK_{73}	—	January 27, 2007	Mount Lemmon	Mount Lemmon Survey	·	2.2 km	MPC · JPL
450714	2007 CG_{28}	—	January 27, 2007	Mount Lemmon	Mount Lemmon Survey	·	1.9 km	MPC · JPL
450715	2007 CE_{31}	—	January 10, 2007	Kitt Peak	Spacewatch	·	660 m	MPC · JPL
450716	2007 DH_{32}	—	February 17, 2007	Kitt Peak	Spacewatch	·	610 m	MPC · JPL
450717	2007 DC_{35}	—	February 17, 2007	Kitt Peak	Spacewatch	·	2.5 km	MPC · JPL
450718	2007 DE_{67}	—	February 21, 2007	Kitt Peak	Spacewatch	·	1.8 km	MPC · JPL
450719	2007 DU_{67}	—	February 21, 2007	Kitt Peak	Spacewatch	·	1.6 km	MPC · JPL
450720	2007 DB_{73}	—	February 21, 2007	Kitt Peak	Spacewatch	·	780 m	MPC · JPL
450721	2007 EV_{8}	—	February 17, 2007	Kitt Peak	Spacewatch	EOS	1.8 km	MPC · JPL
450722	2007 EZ_{13}	—	September 14, 2005	Kitt Peak	Spacewatch	·	690 m	MPC · JPL
450723	2007 EE_{23}	—	March 10, 2007	Mount Lemmon	Mount Lemmon Survey	·	690 m	MPC · JPL
450724	2007 EY_{68}	—	March 10, 2007	Kitt Peak	Spacewatch	·	2.4 km	MPC · JPL
450725	2007 EN_{89}	—	January 28, 2007	Mount Lemmon	Mount Lemmon Survey	·	2.5 km	MPC · JPL
450726	2007 EK_{108}	—	March 11, 2007	Kitt Peak	Spacewatch	·	700 m	MPC · JPL
450727	2007 EL_{220}	—	March 14, 2007	Mount Lemmon	Mount Lemmon Survey	·	620 m	MPC · JPL
450728	2007 EW_{221}	—	March 9, 2007	Kitt Peak	Spacewatch	·	3.6 km	MPC · JPL
450729	2007 FU_{46}	—	March 16, 2007	Kitt Peak	Spacewatch	·	740 m	MPC · JPL
450730	2007 GX_{7}	—	April 7, 2007	Mount Lemmon	Mount Lemmon Survey	·	760 m	MPC · JPL
450731	2007 GR_{16}	—	April 11, 2007	Kitt Peak	Spacewatch	·	3.3 km	MPC · JPL
450732	2007 GA_{21}	—	April 11, 2007	Mount Lemmon	Mount Lemmon Survey	·	620 m	MPC · JPL
450733	2007 GS_{23}	—	April 11, 2007	Kitt Peak	Spacewatch	·	620 m	MPC · JPL
450734	2007 GN_{46}	—	April 14, 2007	Kitt Peak	Spacewatch	·	2.4 km	MPC · JPL
450735	2007 GW_{47}	—	April 14, 2007	Kitt Peak	Spacewatch	·	3.9 km	MPC · JPL
450736	2007 GA_{48}	—	April 14, 2007	Kitt Peak	Spacewatch	·	3.1 km	MPC · JPL
450737 Sarbievius	2007 GD_{52}	Sarbievius	April 14, 2007	Moletai	K. Černis	·	3.4 km	MPC · JPL
450738	2007 GV_{64}	—	April 15, 2007	Kitt Peak	Spacewatch	EOS	2.1 km	MPC · JPL
450739	2007 GD_{66}	—	April 15, 2007	Kitt Peak	Spacewatch	EOS	2.0 km	MPC · JPL
450740	2007 GO_{66}	—	April 15, 2007	Kitt Peak	Spacewatch	·	670 m	MPC · JPL
450741	2007 HV_{23}	—	April 18, 2007	Kitt Peak	Spacewatch	BAP	850 m	MPC · JPL
450742	2007 HP_{36}	—	April 19, 2007	Kitt Peak	Spacewatch	·	2.9 km	MPC · JPL
450743	2007 HP_{38}	—	April 20, 2007	Mount Lemmon	Mount Lemmon Survey	·	540 m	MPC · JPL
450744	2007 HB_{39}	—	March 14, 2007	Mount Lemmon	Mount Lemmon Survey	URS	3.1 km	MPC · JPL
450745	2007 HY_{50}	—	April 20, 2007	Kitt Peak	Spacewatch	·	2.4 km	MPC · JPL
450746	2007 HZ_{55}	—	April 22, 2007	Kitt Peak	Spacewatch	·	2.5 km	MPC · JPL
450747	2007 HH_{59}	—	April 18, 2007	Anderson Mesa	LONEOS	·	3.7 km	MPC · JPL
450748	2007 HM_{66}	—	April 22, 2007	Mount Lemmon	Mount Lemmon Survey	·	1.1 km	MPC · JPL
450749	2007 HY_{74}	—	April 22, 2007	Kitt Peak	Spacewatch	V	580 m	MPC · JPL
450750	2007 HC_{85}	—	April 24, 2007	Kitt Peak	Spacewatch	·	730 m	MPC · JPL
450751	2007 HF_{88}	—	March 13, 2007	Mount Lemmon	Mount Lemmon Survey	·	830 m	MPC · JPL
450752	2007 HR_{97}	—	April 22, 2007	Catalina	CSS	·	1.3 km	MPC · JPL
450753	2007 JC_{17}	—	May 7, 2007	Kitt Peak	Spacewatch	·	960 m	MPC · JPL
450754	2007 JV_{34}	—	May 10, 2007	Kitt Peak	Spacewatch	·	3.0 km	MPC · JPL
450755	2007 JF_{38}	—	May 12, 2007	Mount Lemmon	Mount Lemmon Survey	·	2.8 km	MPC · JPL
450756	2007 JW_{38}	—	May 13, 2007	Mount Lemmon	Mount Lemmon Survey	·	4.1 km	MPC · JPL
450757	2007 JW_{41}	—	May 9, 2007	Catalina	CSS	·	2.9 km	MPC · JPL
450758	2007 LL_{8}	—	June 9, 2007	Kitt Peak	Spacewatch	V	520 m	MPC · JPL
450759	2007 LG_{33}	—	June 15, 2007	Kitt Peak	Spacewatch	·	1.3 km	MPC · JPL
450760	2007 PJ_{1}	—	August 5, 2007	Altschwendt	W. Ries	·	1.3 km	MPC · JPL
450761	2007 QK_{11}	—	August 23, 2007	Kitt Peak	Spacewatch	·	980 m	MPC · JPL
450762	2007 RS_{18}	—	August 23, 2007	Kitt Peak	Spacewatch	·	900 m	MPC · JPL
450763	2007 RX_{40}	—	September 9, 2007	Kitt Peak	Spacewatch	·	1.3 km	MPC · JPL
450764	2007 RY_{102}	—	September 11, 2007	Kitt Peak	Spacewatch	NYS	1.5 km	MPC · JPL
450765	2007 RD_{107}	—	September 11, 2007	Mount Lemmon	Mount Lemmon Survey	·	1.1 km	MPC · JPL
450766	2007 RA_{134}	—	September 11, 2007	XuYi	PMO NEO Survey Program	3:2	4.9 km	MPC · JPL
450767	2007 RD_{140}	—	July 18, 2007	Mount Lemmon	Mount Lemmon Survey	MAS	720 m	MPC · JPL
450768	2007 RZ_{147}	—	September 11, 2007	XuYi	PMO NEO Survey Program	·	1.2 km	MPC · JPL
450769	2007 RS_{157}	—	September 11, 2007	XuYi	PMO NEO Survey Program	·	1.1 km	MPC · JPL
450770	2007 RJ_{159}	—	September 12, 2007	Mount Lemmon	Mount Lemmon Survey	·	640 m	MPC · JPL
450771	2007 RD_{171}	—	September 10, 2007	Kitt Peak	Spacewatch	·	1.4 km	MPC · JPL
450772	2007 RN_{171}	—	August 24, 2007	Kitt Peak	Spacewatch	MAS · critical	580 m	MPC · JPL
450773	2007 RJ_{178}	—	September 10, 2007	Kitt Peak	Spacewatch	·	1.1 km	MPC · JPL
450774	2007 RG_{256}	—	August 24, 2007	Kitt Peak	Spacewatch	·	970 m	MPC · JPL
450775	2007 RK_{260}	—	September 14, 2007	Mount Lemmon	Mount Lemmon Survey	·	840 m	MPC · JPL
450776	2007 RR_{262}	—	August 10, 2007	Kitt Peak	Spacewatch	T_{j} (2.96)	4.3 km	MPC · JPL
450777	2007 SA	—	September 3, 2007	Catalina	CSS	·	1.2 km	MPC · JPL
450778	2007 SW_{5}	—	September 19, 2007	Socorro	LINEAR	·	1.1 km	MPC · JPL
450779	2007 SE_{11}	—	September 20, 2007	Siding Spring	SSS	AMO +1km	980 m	MPC · JPL
450780	2007 SU_{18}	—	September 18, 2007	Mount Lemmon	Mount Lemmon Survey	·	780 m	MPC · JPL
450781	2007 TV_{50}	—	October 4, 2007	Kitt Peak	Spacewatch	·	890 m	MPC · JPL
450782	2007 TW_{72}	—	October 12, 2007	Socorro	LINEAR	H	440 m	MPC · JPL
450783	2007 TA_{96}	—	October 8, 2007	Mount Lemmon	Mount Lemmon Survey	·	1.0 km	MPC · JPL
450784	2007 TL_{126}	—	October 6, 2007	Kitt Peak	Spacewatch	(5)	950 m	MPC · JPL
450785	2007 TS_{158}	—	October 10, 2007	Kitt Peak	Spacewatch	3:2	5.6 km	MPC · JPL
450786	2007 TL_{172}	—	October 14, 2007	Socorro	LINEAR	·	660 m	MPC · JPL
450787	2007 TG_{196}	—	October 7, 2007	Mount Lemmon	Mount Lemmon Survey	·	1.0 km	MPC · JPL
450788	2007 TM_{213}	—	October 7, 2007	Kitt Peak	Spacewatch	EUN	1.4 km	MPC · JPL
450789	2007 TF_{232}	—	October 8, 2007	Kitt Peak	Spacewatch	3:2	4.0 km	MPC · JPL
450790	2007 TM_{235}	—	October 9, 2007	Mount Lemmon	Mount Lemmon Survey	T_{j} (2.98) · 3:2 · SHU	4.0 km	MPC · JPL
450791	2007 TM_{259}	—	October 10, 2007	Mount Lemmon	Mount Lemmon Survey	3:2 · SHU	3.4 km	MPC · JPL
450792	2007 TV_{261}	—	September 13, 2007	Mount Lemmon	Mount Lemmon Survey	·	1.1 km	MPC · JPL
450793	2007 TQ_{271}	—	October 9, 2007	Kitt Peak	Spacewatch	·	560 m	MPC · JPL
450794	2007 TU_{274}	—	September 12, 2007	Mount Lemmon	Mount Lemmon Survey	·	730 m	MPC · JPL
450795	2007 TE_{300}	—	October 12, 2007	Kitt Peak	Spacewatch	3:2	3.8 km	MPC · JPL
450796	2007 TA_{301}	—	October 12, 2007	Kitt Peak	Spacewatch	T_{j} (2.97) · 3:2	3.0 km	MPC · JPL
450797	2007 TJ_{318}	—	October 12, 2007	Kitt Peak	Spacewatch	·	1.7 km	MPC · JPL
450798	2007 TM_{333}	—	September 12, 2007	Mount Lemmon	Mount Lemmon Survey	(5)	1.1 km	MPC · JPL
450799	2007 TO_{345}	—	October 13, 2007	Mount Lemmon	Mount Lemmon Survey	MAS	900 m	MPC · JPL
450800	2007 TB_{368}	—	October 10, 2007	Mount Lemmon	Mount Lemmon Survey	·	580 m	MPC · JPL

== 450801–450900 ==
back to top

Designation			Discovery			Properties		Ref
Permanent	Provisional	Named after	Date	Site	Discoverer(s)	Category	Diam.	Ref
450801	2007 TP_{383}	—	October 14, 2007	Kitt Peak	Spacewatch	T_{j} (2.92)	2.4 km	MPC · JPL
450802	2007 TH_{428}	—	October 10, 2007	Kitt Peak	Spacewatch	·	1.1 km	MPC · JPL
450803	2007 TE_{432}	—	October 4, 2007	Kitt Peak	Spacewatch	3:2	4.5 km	MPC · JPL
450804	2007 TK_{442}	—	October 4, 2007	Catalina	CSS	KON	1.8 km	MPC · JPL
450805	2007 TQ_{444}	—	October 9, 2007	Catalina	CSS	T_{j} (2.99) · 3:2	5.2 km	MPC · JPL
450806 Mariamalibran	2007 TP_{451}	Mariamalibran	October 9, 2007	Catalina	CSS	T_{j} (2.93) · 3:2	5.7 km	MPC · JPL
450807	2007 UC_{9}	—	October 17, 2007	Anderson Mesa	LONEOS	T_{j} (2.89)	5.1 km	MPC · JPL
450808	2007 UL_{39}	—	October 20, 2007	Catalina	CSS	H	470 m	MPC · JPL
450809	2007 UM_{88}	—	October 16, 2007	Mount Lemmon	Mount Lemmon Survey	·	1.0 km	MPC · JPL
450810	2007 UV_{91}	—	October 30, 2007	Mount Lemmon	Mount Lemmon Survey	·	1.0 km	MPC · JPL
450811	2007 UJ_{100}	—	October 15, 2007	Mount Lemmon	Mount Lemmon Survey	·	870 m	MPC · JPL
450812	2007 UK_{100}	—	October 30, 2007	Kitt Peak	Spacewatch	·	890 m	MPC · JPL
450813	2007 UL_{100}	—	October 30, 2007	Kitt Peak	Spacewatch	·	950 m	MPC · JPL
450814	2007 UC_{135}	—	February 14, 2005	Kitt Peak	Spacewatch	NYS	1.1 km	MPC · JPL
450815	2007 VG_{4}	—	November 2, 2007	Dauban	Chante-Perdrix	T_{j} (2.99) · 3:2	4.7 km	MPC · JPL
450816	2007 VD_{13}	—	November 1, 2007	Mount Lemmon	Mount Lemmon Survey	·	1.4 km	MPC · JPL
450817	2007 VK_{21}	—	November 2, 2007	Mount Lemmon	Mount Lemmon Survey	(5)	920 m	MPC · JPL
450818	2007 VQ_{34}	—	November 3, 2007	Kitt Peak	Spacewatch	·	1.0 km	MPC · JPL
450819	2007 VF_{55}	—	November 1, 2007	Kitt Peak	Spacewatch	·	1.2 km	MPC · JPL
450820	2007 VV_{55}	—	November 1, 2007	Kitt Peak	Spacewatch	·	1.2 km	MPC · JPL
450821	2007 VD_{57}	—	October 20, 2007	Mount Lemmon	Mount Lemmon Survey	(5)	930 m	MPC · JPL
450822	2007 VH_{61}	—	November 1, 2007	Kitt Peak	Spacewatch	·	1.2 km	MPC · JPL
450823	2007 VN_{86}	—	November 2, 2007	Socorro	LINEAR	·	670 m	MPC · JPL
450824	2007 VK_{89}	—	November 4, 2007	Socorro	LINEAR	·	1.3 km	MPC · JPL
450825	2007 VC_{93}	—	November 3, 2007	Socorro	LINEAR	·	840 m	MPC · JPL
450826	2007 VA_{95}	—	November 9, 2007	Kitt Peak	Spacewatch	T_{j} (2.95)	3.8 km	MPC · JPL
450827	2007 VZ_{113}	—	November 3, 2007	Kitt Peak	Spacewatch	(5)	1.2 km	MPC · JPL
450828	2007 VM_{120}	—	October 18, 2007	Kitt Peak	Spacewatch	·	1.5 km	MPC · JPL
450829	2007 VF_{147}	—	November 4, 2007	Kitt Peak	Spacewatch	EUN	1.0 km	MPC · JPL
450830	2007 VZ_{164}	—	November 5, 2007	Kitt Peak	Spacewatch	·	1.1 km	MPC · JPL
450831	2007 VP_{166}	—	November 5, 2007	Kitt Peak	Spacewatch	·	1.1 km	MPC · JPL
450832	2007 VL_{169}	—	November 5, 2007	Kitt Peak	Spacewatch	·	980 m	MPC · JPL
450833	2007 VN_{191}	—	November 4, 2007	Mount Lemmon	Mount Lemmon Survey	·	1.4 km	MPC · JPL
450834	2007 VT_{191}	—	November 4, 2007	Mount Lemmon	Mount Lemmon Survey	·	3.3 km	MPC · JPL
450835	2007 VY_{197}	—	November 8, 2007	Mount Lemmon	Mount Lemmon Survey	·	1.2 km	MPC · JPL
450836	2007 VZ_{197}	—	November 8, 2007	Mount Lemmon	Mount Lemmon Survey	·	1.8 km	MPC · JPL
450837	2007 VE_{213}	—	September 14, 2007	Mount Lemmon	Mount Lemmon Survey	T_{j} (2.96)	3.7 km	MPC · JPL
450838	2007 VH_{215}	—	November 1, 2007	Kitt Peak	Spacewatch	·	1.2 km	MPC · JPL
450839	2007 VB_{246}	—	November 2, 2007	Mount Lemmon	Mount Lemmon Survey	T_{j} (2.97) · 3:2 · (6124)	4.6 km	MPC · JPL
450840	2007 VL_{253}	—	November 14, 2007	Mount Lemmon	Mount Lemmon Survey	·	880 m	MPC · JPL
450841	2007 VY_{264}	—	November 13, 2007	Kitt Peak	Spacewatch	3:2	5.3 km	MPC · JPL
450842	2007 VJ_{268}	—	October 10, 2007	Mount Lemmon	Mount Lemmon Survey	·	1.0 km	MPC · JPL
450843	2007 VY_{272}	—	November 2, 2007	Mount Lemmon	Mount Lemmon Survey	H	500 m	MPC · JPL
450844	2007 VS_{273}	—	November 12, 2007	Mount Lemmon	Mount Lemmon Survey	·	1.1 km	MPC · JPL
450845	2007 VX_{291}	—	November 14, 2007	Kitt Peak	Spacewatch	H	630 m	MPC · JPL
450846	2007 VT_{307}	—	November 4, 2007	Kitt Peak	Spacewatch	·	1.8 km	MPC · JPL
450847	2007 VF_{313}	—	November 6, 2007	Kitt Peak	Spacewatch	·	980 m	MPC · JPL
450848	2007 WV_{16}	—	November 3, 2007	Kitt Peak	Spacewatch	·	970 m	MPC · JPL
450849	2007 WE_{27}	—	November 18, 2007	Mount Lemmon	Mount Lemmon Survey	·	860 m	MPC · JPL
450850	2007 WF_{39}	—	November 19, 2007	Mount Lemmon	Mount Lemmon Survey	·	1.2 km	MPC · JPL
450851	2007 WT_{49}	—	November 24, 2003	Kitt Peak	Spacewatch	·	930 m	MPC · JPL
450852	2007 WU_{53}	—	November 18, 2007	Mount Lemmon	Mount Lemmon Survey	·	790 m	MPC · JPL
450853	2007 WQ_{55}	—	October 24, 2007	Mount Lemmon	Mount Lemmon Survey	·	1.7 km	MPC · JPL
450854	2007 WJ_{63}	—	November 20, 2007	Mount Lemmon	Mount Lemmon Survey	·	1.7 km	MPC · JPL
450855	2007 XF_{4}	—	November 19, 2007	Kitt Peak	Spacewatch	·	880 m	MPC · JPL
450856	2007 XB_{15}	—	December 5, 2007	Mount Lemmon	Mount Lemmon Survey	·	1.4 km	MPC · JPL
450857	2007 XM_{16}	—	December 6, 2007	Mount Lemmon	Mount Lemmon Survey	·	2.4 km	MPC · JPL
450858	2007 XU_{23}	—	December 12, 2007	Great Shefford	Birtwhistle, P.	(5)	950 m	MPC · JPL
450859	2007 XJ_{24}	—	November 7, 2007	Kitt Peak	Spacewatch	H	640 m	MPC · JPL
450860	2007 XB_{26}	—	November 8, 2007	Kitt Peak	Spacewatch	·	890 m	MPC · JPL
450861	2007 XU_{33}	—	December 18, 2007	Kitt Peak	Spacewatch	RAF	990 m	MPC · JPL
450862	2007 XU_{45}	—	December 15, 2007	Kitt Peak	Spacewatch	·	1.1 km	MPC · JPL
450863	2007 XG_{50}	—	December 13, 2007	Tiki	Teamo, N.	·	1.6 km	MPC · JPL
450864	2007 XX_{57}	—	December 5, 2007	Kitt Peak	Spacewatch	ADE	1.8 km	MPC · JPL
450865	2007 XJ_{58}	—	December 5, 2007	Mount Lemmon	Mount Lemmon Survey	·	1.5 km	MPC · JPL
450866	2007 YR_{18}	—	December 3, 2007	Kitt Peak	Spacewatch	·	1.2 km	MPC · JPL
450867	2007 YB_{19}	—	December 16, 2007	Kitt Peak	Spacewatch	(5)	1.1 km	MPC · JPL
450868	2007 YB_{27}	—	December 18, 2007	Mount Lemmon	Mount Lemmon Survey	(5)	1.5 km	MPC · JPL
450869	2007 YS_{38}	—	December 18, 2007	Kitt Peak	Spacewatch	·	1.5 km	MPC · JPL
450870	2007 YE_{50}	—	November 4, 2007	Mount Lemmon	Mount Lemmon Survey	WIT	1 km	MPC · JPL
450871	2007 YH_{57}	—	December 28, 2007	Kitt Peak	Spacewatch	·	820 m	MPC · JPL
450872	2007 YU_{62}	—	December 30, 2007	Kitt Peak	Spacewatch	·	2.5 km	MPC · JPL
450873	2007 YJ_{69}	—	December 28, 2007	Kitt Peak	Spacewatch	·	1.3 km	MPC · JPL
450874	2007 YD_{74}	—	December 31, 2007	Catalina	CSS	·	970 m	MPC · JPL
450875	2008 AL_{9}	—	January 10, 2008	Mount Lemmon	Mount Lemmon Survey	·	1.1 km	MPC · JPL
450876	2008 AA_{18}	—	December 30, 2007	Kitt Peak	Spacewatch	·	1.2 km	MPC · JPL
450877	2008 AR_{21}	—	January 10, 2008	Mount Lemmon	Mount Lemmon Survey	·	1.9 km	MPC · JPL
450878	2008 AF_{23}	—	January 10, 2008	Mount Lemmon	Mount Lemmon Survey	·	2.3 km	MPC · JPL
450879	2008 AY_{34}	—	December 31, 2007	Mount Lemmon	Mount Lemmon Survey	·	1.5 km	MPC · JPL
450880	2008 AX_{40}	—	January 10, 2008	Mount Lemmon	Mount Lemmon Survey	·	1.5 km	MPC · JPL
450881	2008 AA_{52}	—	November 18, 2007	Mount Lemmon	Mount Lemmon Survey	EUN	1.0 km	MPC · JPL
450882	2008 AL_{55}	—	December 30, 2007	Kitt Peak	Spacewatch	·	1.6 km	MPC · JPL
450883	2008 AD_{57}	—	December 30, 2007	Kitt Peak	Spacewatch	·	1.3 km	MPC · JPL
450884	2008 AU_{72}	—	January 15, 2008	Socorro	LINEAR	·	980 m	MPC · JPL
450885	2008 AW_{81}	—	January 13, 2008	Mount Lemmon	Mount Lemmon Survey	·	1.6 km	MPC · JPL
450886	2008 AH_{92}	—	January 14, 2008	Kitt Peak	Spacewatch	·	1.4 km	MPC · JPL
450887	2008 AH_{93}	—	January 1, 2008	Kitt Peak	Spacewatch	·	1.4 km	MPC · JPL
450888	2008 AM_{94}	—	January 14, 2008	Kitt Peak	Spacewatch	·	1.7 km	MPC · JPL
450889	2008 AM_{96}	—	January 14, 2008	Kitt Peak	Spacewatch	(5)	1.1 km	MPC · JPL
450890	2008 AX_{104}	—	January 15, 2008	Kitt Peak	Spacewatch	BRG	1.1 km	MPC · JPL
450891	2008 AU_{106}	—	January 15, 2008	Kitt Peak	Spacewatch	(5)	1.2 km	MPC · JPL
450892	2008 BT_{10}	—	January 18, 2008	Kitt Peak	Spacewatch	MAR	1.2 km	MPC · JPL
450893	2008 BR_{17}	—	December 30, 2007	Kitt Peak	Spacewatch	·	2.2 km	MPC · JPL
450894	2008 BT_{18}	—	January 31, 2008	Socorro	LINEAR	APO +1km · PHA · moon	830 m	MPC · JPL
450895	2008 BL_{21}	—	January 30, 2008	Mount Lemmon	Mount Lemmon Survey	(5)	1.2 km	MPC · JPL
450896	2008 BE_{24}	—	January 1, 2008	Kitt Peak	Spacewatch	·	1.6 km	MPC · JPL
450897	2008 BO_{32}	—	January 30, 2008	Mount Lemmon	Mount Lemmon Survey	GEF	1.1 km	MPC · JPL
450898	2008 BP_{43}	—	January 18, 2008	Catalina	CSS	·	1.7 km	MPC · JPL
450899	2008 BE_{52}	—	January 19, 2008	Mount Lemmon	Mount Lemmon Survey	·	1.7 km	MPC · JPL
450900	2008 CX_{13}	—	February 3, 2008	Kitt Peak	Spacewatch	·	1.8 km	MPC · JPL

== 450901–451000 ==
back to top

Designation			Discovery			Properties		Ref
Permanent	Provisional	Named after	Date	Site	Discoverer(s)	Category	Diam.	Ref
450901	2008 CD_{21}	—	February 3, 2008	Catalina	CSS	·	1.2 km	MPC · JPL
450902	2008 CB_{60}	—	February 7, 2008	Kitt Peak	Spacewatch	·	1.6 km	MPC · JPL
450903	2008 CL_{77}	—	February 6, 2008	Catalina	CSS	·	1.5 km	MPC · JPL
450904	2008 CT_{108}	—	September 15, 2007	Mount Lemmon	Mount Lemmon Survey	·	1.0 km	MPC · JPL
450905	2008 CK_{118}	—	February 3, 2008	Catalina	CSS	RAF	1.0 km	MPC · JPL
450906	2008 CL_{122}	—	February 7, 2008	Mount Lemmon	Mount Lemmon Survey	AGN	950 m	MPC · JPL
450907	2008 CV_{128}	—	February 8, 2008	Kitt Peak	Spacewatch	·	1.5 km	MPC · JPL
450908	2008 CX_{144}	—	February 9, 2008	Kitt Peak	Spacewatch	·	2.0 km	MPC · JPL
450909	2008 CX_{160}	—	February 9, 2008	Kitt Peak	Spacewatch	·	1.2 km	MPC · JPL
450910	2008 CB_{176}	—	September 25, 2007	Mount Lemmon	Mount Lemmon Survey	·	1.7 km	MPC · JPL
450911	2008 CF_{180}	—	January 1, 2008	Catalina	CSS	·	1.6 km	MPC · JPL
450912	2008 CO_{206}	—	February 9, 2008	Kitt Peak	Spacewatch	·	1.7 km	MPC · JPL
450913	2008 CC_{207}	—	February 12, 2008	Kitt Peak	Spacewatch	HOF	2.5 km	MPC · JPL
450914	2008 CU_{214}	—	February 12, 2008	Kitt Peak	Spacewatch	·	1.6 km	MPC · JPL
450915	2008 DD_{3}	—	January 10, 2008	Kitt Peak	Spacewatch	·	1.1 km	MPC · JPL
450916	2008 DD_{7}	—	February 2, 2008	Kitt Peak	Spacewatch	·	1.3 km	MPC · JPL
450917	2008 DH_{34}	—	February 10, 2008	Mount Lemmon	Mount Lemmon Survey	·	1.4 km	MPC · JPL
450918	2008 DZ_{40}	—	December 30, 2007	Mount Lemmon	Mount Lemmon Survey	·	1.5 km	MPC · JPL
450919	2008 DN_{48}	—	December 31, 2007	Mount Lemmon	Mount Lemmon Survey	JUN	1.2 km	MPC · JPL
450920	2008 DB_{51}	—	December 19, 2007	Mount Lemmon	Mount Lemmon Survey	·	1.7 km	MPC · JPL
450921	2008 DH_{89}	—	February 28, 2008	Kitt Peak	Spacewatch	·	2.6 km	MPC · JPL
450922	2008 ED_{1}	—	March 2, 2008	Vail-Jarnac	Jarnac	·	2.1 km	MPC · JPL
450923	2008 EK_{5}	—	February 13, 2008	Catalina	CSS	·	1.3 km	MPC · JPL
450924	2008 EN_{8}	—	February 28, 2008	Catalina	CSS	ADE	2.1 km	MPC · JPL
450925	2008 EB_{33}	—	January 12, 2008	Catalina	CSS	·	2.0 km	MPC · JPL
450926	2008 ER_{46}	—	March 5, 2008	Mount Lemmon	Mount Lemmon Survey	·	2.5 km	MPC · JPL
450927	2008 EB_{47}	—	March 5, 2008	Mount Lemmon	Mount Lemmon Survey	·	1.6 km	MPC · JPL
450928	2008 EY_{76}	—	March 7, 2008	Kitt Peak	Spacewatch	MRX	1.0 km	MPC · JPL
450929	2008 EE_{99}	—	February 14, 2008	Catalina	CSS	JUN	1.1 km	MPC · JPL
450930	2008 EW_{148}	—	March 2, 2008	Kitt Peak	Spacewatch	H	420 m	MPC · JPL
450931 Coculescu	2008 EX_{154}	Coculescu	March 11, 2008	La Silla	EURONEAR	·	1.8 km	MPC · JPL
450932	2008 EG_{165}	—	March 2, 2008	Kitt Peak	Spacewatch	·	1.5 km	MPC · JPL
450933	2008 FY_{14}	—	March 26, 2008	Kitt Peak	Spacewatch	·	1.3 km	MPC · JPL
450934	2008 FS_{15}	—	January 19, 2008	Mount Lemmon	Mount Lemmon Survey	·	1.8 km	MPC · JPL
450935	2008 FX_{21}	—	March 27, 2008	Kitt Peak	Spacewatch	·	1.4 km	MPC · JPL
450936	2008 FN_{23}	—	March 27, 2008	Kitt Peak	Spacewatch	·	2.3 km	MPC · JPL
450937	2008 FJ_{46}	—	March 28, 2008	Mount Lemmon	Mount Lemmon Survey	JUN	730 m	MPC · JPL
450938	2008 FE_{78}	—	February 13, 2008	Mount Lemmon	Mount Lemmon Survey	·	1.9 km	MPC · JPL
450939	2008 FQ_{79}	—	March 27, 2008	Mount Lemmon	Mount Lemmon Survey	·	3.0 km	MPC · JPL
450940	2008 FU_{87}	—	March 28, 2008	Mount Lemmon	Mount Lemmon Survey	·	1.8 km	MPC · JPL
450941	2008 FD_{97}	—	March 29, 2008	Mount Lemmon	Mount Lemmon Survey	·	3.4 km	MPC · JPL
450942	2008 FH_{109}	—	March 31, 2008	Mount Lemmon	Mount Lemmon Survey	HOF	2.2 km	MPC · JPL
450943	2008 FC_{126}	—	March 31, 2008	Mount Lemmon	Mount Lemmon Survey	·	3.1 km	MPC · JPL
450944	2008 FR_{127}	—	March 5, 2008	Mount Lemmon	Mount Lemmon Survey	EOS	2.0 km	MPC · JPL
450945	2008 FM_{132}	—	March 28, 2008	Kitt Peak	Spacewatch	AGN	990 m	MPC · JPL
450946	2008 FL_{135}	—	March 31, 2008	Mount Lemmon	Mount Lemmon Survey	·	1.5 km	MPC · JPL
450947	2008 GS_{114}	—	April 3, 2008	Kitt Peak	Spacewatch	·	2.2 km	MPC · JPL
450948	2008 GD_{127}	—	April 14, 2008	Mount Lemmon	Mount Lemmon Survey	·	2.8 km	MPC · JPL
450949	2008 GG_{138}	—	April 15, 2008	Mount Lemmon	Mount Lemmon Survey	·	2.5 km	MPC · JPL
450950	2008 GW_{141}	—	April 7, 2008	Kitt Peak	Spacewatch	DOR	2.4 km	MPC · JPL
450951	2008 HL_{8}	—	April 3, 2008	Mount Lemmon	Mount Lemmon Survey	·	1.8 km	MPC · JPL
450952	2008 HF_{19}	—	April 26, 2008	Mount Lemmon	Mount Lemmon Survey	·	1.8 km	MPC · JPL
450953	2008 HC_{58}	—	April 4, 2008	Catalina	CSS	·	2.3 km	MPC · JPL
450954	2008 HC_{65}	—	April 14, 2008	Kitt Peak	Spacewatch	·	2.0 km	MPC · JPL
450955	2008 JX_{22}	—	April 6, 2008	Mount Lemmon	Mount Lemmon Survey	EOS	1.7 km	MPC · JPL
450956	2008 JS_{28}	—	October 13, 2004	Anderson Mesa	LONEOS	·	3.9 km	MPC · JPL
450957	2008 JT_{33}	—	May 11, 2008	Kitt Peak	Spacewatch	·	1.8 km	MPC · JPL
450958	2008 JE_{40}	—	April 4, 2008	Kitt Peak	Spacewatch	·	1.4 km	MPC · JPL
450959	2008 KF_{1}	—	May 26, 2008	Kitt Peak	Spacewatch	·	2.5 km	MPC · JPL
450960	2008 KB_{2}	—	May 3, 2008	Mount Lemmon	Mount Lemmon Survey	·	3.2 km	MPC · JPL
450961	2008 KD_{4}	—	May 13, 2008	Mount Lemmon	Mount Lemmon Survey	·	2.8 km	MPC · JPL
450962	2008 KD_{24}	—	May 28, 2008	Kitt Peak	Spacewatch	·	3.5 km	MPC · JPL
450963	2008 KN_{34}	—	May 31, 2008	Mount Lemmon	Mount Lemmon Survey	·	3.6 km	MPC · JPL
450964	2008 KG_{39}	—	May 30, 2008	Kitt Peak	Spacewatch	·	1.9 km	MPC · JPL
450965	2008 NW_{3}	—	July 13, 2008	Eskridge	G. Hug	·	560 m	MPC · JPL
450966	2008 PK_{8}	—	July 26, 2008	Siding Spring	SSS	·	610 m	MPC · JPL
450967	2008 PW_{8}	—	August 6, 2008	La Sagra	OAM	·	610 m	MPC · JPL
450968	2008 QA_{32}	—	August 30, 2008	Socorro	LINEAR	·	760 m	MPC · JPL
450969	2008 QS_{38}	—	August 24, 2008	Kitt Peak	Spacewatch	V	530 m	MPC · JPL
450970	2008 QX_{45}	—	August 26, 2008	Socorro	LINEAR	·	610 m	MPC · JPL
450971	2008 RD_{43}	—	September 2, 2008	Kitt Peak	Spacewatch	·	580 m	MPC · JPL
450972	2008 RJ_{72}	—	September 6, 2008	Mount Lemmon	Mount Lemmon Survey	·	510 m	MPC · JPL
450973	2008 RP_{75}	—	September 6, 2008	Mount Lemmon	Mount Lemmon Survey	·	650 m	MPC · JPL
450974	2008 RM_{144}	—	September 3, 2008	Kitt Peak	Spacewatch	V	620 m	MPC · JPL
450975	2008 RM_{146}	—	September 7, 2008	Mount Lemmon	Mount Lemmon Survey	·	680 m	MPC · JPL
450976	2008 SN_{4}	—	September 22, 2008	Socorro	LINEAR	·	820 m	MPC · JPL
450977	2008 SM_{7}	—	September 23, 2008	Goodricke-Pigott	R. A. Tucker	·	980 m	MPC · JPL
450978	2008 SB_{9}	—	September 22, 2008	Socorro	LINEAR	·	740 m	MPC · JPL
450979	2008 SO_{28}	—	September 19, 2008	Kitt Peak	Spacewatch	·	710 m	MPC · JPL
450980	2008 SL_{30}	—	February 25, 2007	Mount Lemmon	Mount Lemmon Survey	·	900 m	MPC · JPL
450981	2008 SM_{84}	—	September 27, 2008	Taunus	Karge, S., E. Schwab	·	630 m	MPC · JPL
450982	2008 SX_{94}	—	September 21, 2008	Kitt Peak	Spacewatch	·	640 m	MPC · JPL
450983	2008 SV_{122}	—	September 22, 2008	Mount Lemmon	Mount Lemmon Survey	·	800 m	MPC · JPL
450984	2008 SL_{193}	—	September 25, 2008	Kitt Peak	Spacewatch	·	590 m	MPC · JPL
450985	2008 SN_{223}	—	November 25, 2005	Mount Lemmon	Mount Lemmon Survey	·	550 m	MPC · JPL
450986	2008 SB_{285}	—	September 27, 2008	Mount Lemmon	Mount Lemmon Survey	·	740 m	MPC · JPL
450987	2008 SA_{293}	—	September 20, 2008	Catalina	CSS	·	680 m	MPC · JPL
450988	2008 SO_{303}	—	September 24, 2008	Kitt Peak	Spacewatch	·	610 m	MPC · JPL
450989	2008 SD_{309}	—	September 21, 2008	Kitt Peak	Spacewatch	·	670 m	MPC · JPL
450990	2008 SO_{309}	—	September 29, 2008	Mount Lemmon	Mount Lemmon Survey	·	860 m	MPC · JPL
450991	2008 TG_{2}	—	October 3, 2008	Tiki	Teamo, N.	·	740 m	MPC · JPL
450992	2008 TJ_{21}	—	October 1, 2008	Mount Lemmon	Mount Lemmon Survey	PHO	1.2 km	MPC · JPL
450993	2008 TK_{48}	—	October 2, 2008	Kitt Peak	Spacewatch	·	780 m	MPC · JPL
450994	2008 TL_{49}	—	October 2, 2008	Kitt Peak	Spacewatch	V	520 m	MPC · JPL
450995	2008 TW_{55}	—	September 20, 2008	Kitt Peak	Spacewatch	·	680 m	MPC · JPL
450996	2008 TZ_{57}	—	September 24, 2008	Kitt Peak	Spacewatch	·	650 m	MPC · JPL
450997	2008 TZ_{89}	—	October 3, 2008	Kitt Peak	Spacewatch	·	490 m	MPC · JPL
450998	2008 TV_{91}	—	October 4, 2008	La Sagra	OAM	·	850 m	MPC · JPL
450999	2008 TL_{106}	—	October 6, 2008	Kitt Peak	Spacewatch	·	420 m	MPC · JPL
451000	2008 TW_{114}	—	December 26, 2005	Mount Lemmon	Mount Lemmon Survey	·	690 m	MPC · JPL

back to top

== Meaning of names ==
As minor planet discoveries are confirmed, they are given a permanent number by the IAU's Minor Planet Center (MPC), and the discoverers can then submit names for them, following the IAU's naming conventions. The list below concerns those minor planets in the specified number-range that have received names, and explains the meanings of those names.

Official naming citations of newly named small Solar System bodies are approved and published in a bulletin by IAU's Working Group for Small Bodies Nomenclature (WGSBN). Before May 2021, citations were published in MPC's Minor Planet Circulars for many decades. Recent citations can also be found on the JPL Small-Body Database (SBDB). Until his death in 2016, German astronomer Lutz D. Schmadel compiled these citations into the Dictionary of Minor Planet Names (DMP) and regularly updated the collection.

Based on Paul Herget's The Names of the Minor Planets, Schmadel also researched the unclear origin of numerous asteroids, most of which had been named prior to World War II. This article incorporates text from this source, which is in the public domain: SBDB New namings may only be added to this list below after official publication as the preannouncement of names is condemned. The WGSBN publishes a comprehensive guideline for the naming rules of non-cometary small Solar System bodies.

Named minor planet	Provisional	This minor planet was named for...	Ref · Catalog
450297 Csákánybéla	2004 PN_{42}	Béla Csákány (1932–2022), a Hungarian mathematician.	IAU · 450297
450390 Pitchcomment	2005 PN_{5}	Pitch Comment (born 1970) is a press artist and cartoonist in the Swiss Jura. He lives in Porrentruy, workplace of the discoverer Michel Ory.	JPL · 450390
450737 Sarbievius	2007 GD_{52}	Matthias Casimirus Sarbievius (Maciej Kazimierz Sarbiewski; 1595–1640) was a Polish-Lithuanian Jesuit and poet, and considered Europe's most prominent Latin poet in the 17th century.	JPL · 450737
450806 Mariamalibran	2007 TP_{51}	Maria Felicia Malibran, Spanish mezzo-soprano and opera singers.	IAU · 450806
450931 Coculescu	2008 EX_{154}	Nicolae Coculescu (1866–1952), a Romanian astronomer, founder and first director of the Bucharest Astronomical Observatory (073), Romania	JPL · 450931
