= V-type asteroid =

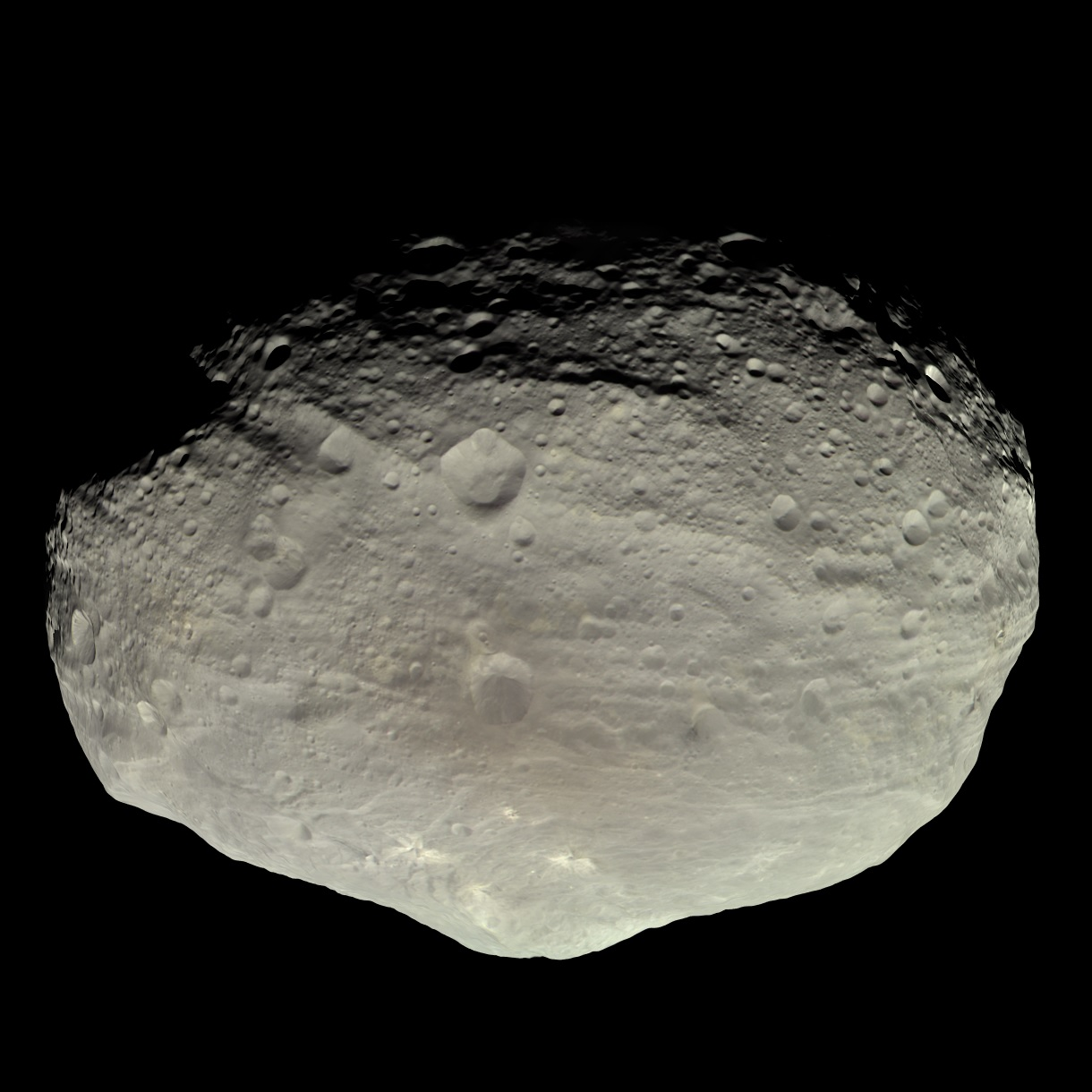
4 Vesta, an example of a V-type asteroid

A V-type (volcanic-type) asteroid, or Vestoid, is an asteroid whose spectral type is that of 4 Vesta. Approximately 6% of main-belt asteroids are vestoids, with Vesta being by far the largest of them. They are relatively bright, and rather similar to the more common S-type asteroid, which are also made up of stony irons and ordinary chondrites, with V-types containing more pyroxene than S-types.

A large proportion of vestoids have orbital elements similar to those of Vesta, either close enough to be part of the Vesta family, or having similar eccentricities and inclinations but with a semi-major axis lying between about 2.18 AU and the 3:1 Kirkwood gap at 2.50 AU. This suggests that they originated as fragments of Vesta's crust. There seem to be two populations of Vestoids, one created 2 billion years ago and the other 1 billion years ago, coming respectively from the enormous southern-hemisphere craters Veneneia and Rheasilvia. Fragments that ended up in the 3:1 Jupiter resonance were perturbed out of the Kirkwood gap and some fragments eventually hit the earth as HED meteorites.

The electromagnetic spectrum has a very strong absorption feature longward of 0.75 μm, another feature around 1 μm and is very red shortwards of 0.7 μm. The visible wavelength spectrum of the V-type asteroids (including 4 Vesta itself) is similar to the spectra of basaltic achondrite HED meteorites.

A J-type has been suggested for asteroids having a particularly strong 1 μm absorption band similar to diogenite meteorites, likely being derived from deeper parts of the crust of 4 Vesta.

== Distribution ==
The vast majority of V-type asteroids are members of the Vesta family along with Vesta itself. There are some Mars-crossers such as 9969 Braille, and some Near-Earth objects like 3908 Nyx.

There is also a scattered group of objects in the general vicinity of the Vesta family but not part of it. These include:

- 809 Lundia — Orbits within the Flora family region
- 956 Elisa
- 1459 Magnya — Orbits in the outer asteroid belt, too far from Vesta to be genetically related. May be the remains of a different ancient differentiated body that was shattered long ago.
- 2113 Ehrdni
- 2442 Corbett
- 2566 Kirghizia
- 2579 Spartacus — Contains a significant portion of olivine, which may indicate origin deeper within Vestoid than other V-types.
- 2640 Hallstrom
- 2653 Principia
- 2704 Julian Loewe
- 2763 Jeans
- 2795 Lepage
- 2851 Harbin
- 2912 Lapalma
- 3849 Incidentia
- 3850 Peltier — Orbits within the Flora family region
- 3869 Norton
- 4188 Kitezh
- 4278 Harvey — Member of Baptistina family.
- 4434 Nikulin
- 4796 Lewis
- 4977 Rauthgundis
- 5379 Abehiroshi

== V-type near-Earth asteroids ==
- 2006 VV2
- 2008 BT18

== See also ==
- Asteroid spectral types
