= 956 Elisa =

Main-belt asteroid

Discovery
- Discovered by: K. Reinmuth
- Discovery site: Heidelberg Obs.
- Discovery date: 8 August 1921

Designations
- Pronunciation: German: [ɛˈliːzaː] English: /ɪˈlaɪsə/
- Named after: Elisa Reinmuth (discoverer's mother)
- Alternative designations: A921 PE · 1959 NB; 1921 JW
- Minor planet category: main-belt · (inner); Flora

Orbital characteristics
- Epoch 31 May 2020 (JD 2459000.5)
- Uncertainty parameter 0
- Observation arc: 98.41 yr (35,943 d)
- Aphelion: 2.7686 AU
- Perihelion: 1.8282 AU
- Semi-major axis: 2.2984 AU
- Eccentricity: 0.2046
- Orbital period (sidereal): 3.48 yr (1,273 d)
- Mean anomaly: 136.20°
- Mean motion: 0° 16^{m} 58.44^{s} / day
- Inclination: 5.9626°
- Longitude of ascending node: 192.64°
- Argument of perihelion: 125.36°

Physical characteristics
- Mean diameter: 10.474±0.208 km; 10.6±0.5 km
- Synodic rotation period: 16.492±0.006 h
- Geometric albedo: 0.142±0.022; 0.147±0.022
- Spectral type: V (S3OS2)
- Absolute magnitude (H): 12.1

956 Elisa (prov. designation: A921 PE or 1921 JW) is a Flora asteroid from the inner regions of the asteroid belt, approximately 10.5 kilometers (6.5 miles) in diameter. It was discovered on 8 August 1921, by German astronomer Karl Reinmuth at the Heidelberg Observatory. The V-type asteroid has a rotation period of 16.5 hours. It was named after Elisa Reinmuth, mother of the discoverer.

== Orbit and classification ==
When applying the synthetic hierarchical clustering method (HCM) by Nesvorný, Elisa is a member of the Flora family (402), a giant asteroid family and the largest family of stony asteroids in the main-belt. However, according to another HCM-analysis by Milani and Knežević (AstDys), it is a background asteroid as this analysis does not recognize the Flora asteroid clan.

Elisa orbits the Sun in the inner asteroid belt at a distance of 1.8–2.8 AU once every 3 years and 6 months (1,273 days; semi-major axis of 2.3 AU). Its orbit has an eccentricity of 0.20 and an inclination of 6° with respect to the ecliptic. The body's observation arc begins at Heidelberg Observatory on 9 August 1921, the night after its official discovery observation.

== Naming ==
This minor planet was named after Elisa Reinmuth, mother of the discoverer Karl Reinmuth. The naming was mentioned in The Names of the Minor Planets by Paul Herget in 1955 (H 92).

== Physical characteristics ==
In both the Tholen- and SMASS-like taxonomy of the Small Solar System Objects Spectroscopic Survey (S3OS2), Elisa is a V-type asteroid. These asteroids are also called "Vestoids", thought to have originates from an ejecting impact event on 4 Vesta.

=== Rotation period ===
In July 2008, a rotational lightcurve of Elisa was obtained from photometric observations by Matthieu Conjat at Nice Observatory in France. Lightcurve analysis gave a well-defined rotation period of 16.492±0.006 hours with a brightness variation of 0.36±0.02 magnitude (U=3). During the same opposition, Vladimir Benishek at Belgrade Observatory (057) and Lucy Lim with the Spitzer-team determined a period for this asteroid of 16.5075±0.0007 and 16.494±0.001 hours with an amplitude of 0.37±0.02 and 0.35±0.02 magnitude, respectively (U=3/3–).

=== Diameter and albedo ===
According to the survey carried out by the NEOWISE mission of NASA's Wide-field Infrared Survey Explorer (WISE) and the Spitzer Space Telescope, Elisa measures 10.474±0.208 and 10.6±0.5 kilometers in diameter and its surface has an albedo of 0.147±0.022 and 0.142±0.022, respectively. The Collaborative Asteroid Lightcurve Link assumes a standard albedo for a Flora asteroid of 0.24 and calculates a diameter of 10.31 kilometers based on an absolute magnitude of 12.1. The WISE team has also published two smaller mean-diameters of 8.02±1.09 km and 8.40±0.67 km with higher albedos of 0.41±0.21 and 0.362±0.071.
