= (450894) 2008 BT18 =

Sub-kilometer asteroid and synchronous binary system

(450894) 2008 BT_{18}
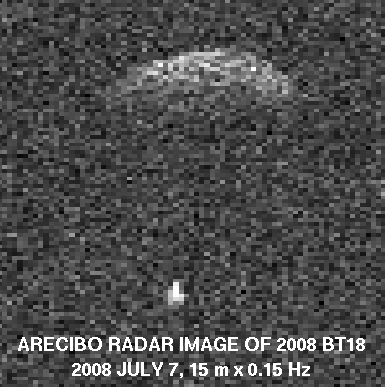
- Radar image of 2008 BT_{18} and its satellite from Arecibo Observatory in July 2008

Discovery
- Discovered by: LINEAR
- Discovery site: Lincoln Lab's ETS
- Discovery date: 31 January 2008

Designations
- Minor planet category: Apollo · NEO · PHA

Orbital characteristics
- Epoch 4 September 2017 (JD 2458000.5)
- Uncertainty parameter 0
- Observation arc: 60.59 yr (22,132 days)
- Earliest precovery date: 14 March 1955
- Aphelion: 3.5401 AU
- Perihelion: 0.9030 AU
- Semi-major axis: 2.2216 AU
- Eccentricity: 0.5935
- Orbital period (sidereal): 3.31 yr (1,209 days)
- Mean anomaly: 284.48°
- Mean motion: 0° 17^{m} 51.72^{s} / day
- Inclination: 8.1338°
- Longitude of ascending node: 107.67°
- Argument of perihelion: 139.28°
- Known satellites: 1 (Note: Benner (2008) web: diameter 0.6 kilometers. Central Bureau Electronic Telegrams, No. 1450, #1 (2008). Summary figures at Collaborative Asteroid Lightcurve Link (CALL) for (450894)) (Note: Central Bureau for Astronomical Telegrams, No. 1450, from 29 July 2008: Arecibo (2380-MHz, 12.6-cm) and Goldstone (8560-MHz, 3.5-cm) radar observations during July 6, 7, and 11 reveal that minor planet 2008 BT_18 (cf. MPECs 2008-C03, 2008-H06; MPO 140193) is a binary system. Preliminary estimates for the component diameters are about 0.6 km and > 200 m. The maximum distance between the components on July 11 is at least 1.5 km. Reported by: L. A. M. Benner, Jet Propulsion Laboratory (JPL), California Institute of Technology (CIT); M. C. Nolan and E. S. Howell, Arecibo Observatory, National Astronomy and Ionosphere Center; C. Magri, University of Maine at Farmington; J. D. Giorgini, S. J. Ostro, and M. Brozovic, JPL/CIT; M. W. Busch, CIT; J. L. Margot and P. A. Taylor, Cornell University; M. K. Shepard, Bloomsburg University; L. M. Carter, Smithsonian Institution; and T. M. Becker, Lehigh University CBET No. 1450)
- Earth MOID: 0.0108 AU · 4.2 LD

Physical characteristics
- Dimensions: 0.6 km 0.650 km (calculated)
- Synodic rotation period: 2.726±0.007 h
- Geometric albedo: 0.20 (assumed)
- Spectral type: V · S (assumed)
- Absolute magnitude (H): 18.3

(450894) 2008 BT_{18} is a sub-kilometer asteroid and synchronous binary system, classified as near-Earth object and potentially hazardous asteroid of the Apollo group. It was discovered on 31 January 2008, by the LINEAR program at Lincoln Laboratory's Experimental Test Site near Socorro, New Mexico, United States. The eccentric asteroid measures approximately 600 meters in diameter and has a composition of a basaltic achondrite.

In 2008, its minor-planet moon, designated S/2008 (450894) 1, was discovered by radar astronomers. It measures approximately 200 meters in diameter, or one third of its primary.

== Orbit and classification ==
2008 BT_{18} orbits the Sun at a distance of 0.9–3.5 AU once every 3 years and 4 months (1,209 days). Its orbit has an eccentricity of 0.59 and an inclination of 8° with respect to the ecliptic. Published by the Digitized Sky Survey, a first precovery was taken at Palomar Observatory in 1955, extending the asteroid's observation arc by 53 years prior to its discovery.

The asteroid has a low Earth minimum orbit intersection distance of 0.0108 AU (1,620,000 km) which corresponds to 4.2 lunar distances (LD). On 14 July 2008, it transited Earth within 0.015 AU (5.9 LD).

== Physical characteristics ==
2008 BT_{18} has been characterized as a V-type asteroid by astronomers using the SpeX spectrograph at NASA Infrared Telescope Facility, IRTF.

=== Rotation period ===
A rotational lightcurve for 2008 BT_{18} was obtained from photometric observations made by astronomer Alberto Silva Betzler at Salvador, Brazil, in July 2008. The lightcurve gave a rotation period of 2.726±0.007 hours with a brightness variation of 0.04 in magnitude (U=1).

=== Binary system ===
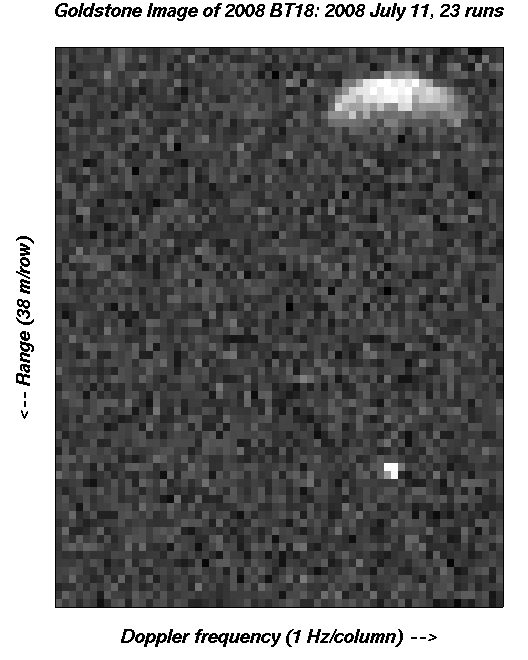
Radar image of 2008 BT_{18} and its satellite by Arecibo Observatory on 1 July 2008

On 6 and 7 July 2008, research conducted using the Arecibo Observatory produced evidence that 2008 BT_{18} is a synchronous binary asteroid with a minor-planet moon in its orbit. The secondary component has a diameter of at least 200 meters, about 33% the size of and up to 1.5 kilometers apart from its primary. The Collaborative Asteroid Lightcurve Link assumes a standard albedo for stony asteroids of 0.20 and calculates a diameter of 650 meters, based on an absolute magnitude of 18.3.

There are more than 60 binary near-Earth objects known to exist (2016).

=== Mineralogy ===
On 26 July 2008, observations at the IRTF using the SpeX-spectrograph showed that 2008 BT_{18} is a basaltic achondrite, suggesting that its parent body was subjected to sufficiently high temperatures to produce a eutectic melt. The body's surface is thought to be dominated by iron-rich orthopyroxenes with little or no olivine.

== Naming ==
As of 2017, this minor planet remains unnamed.
