= Vrdy =

- Municipality
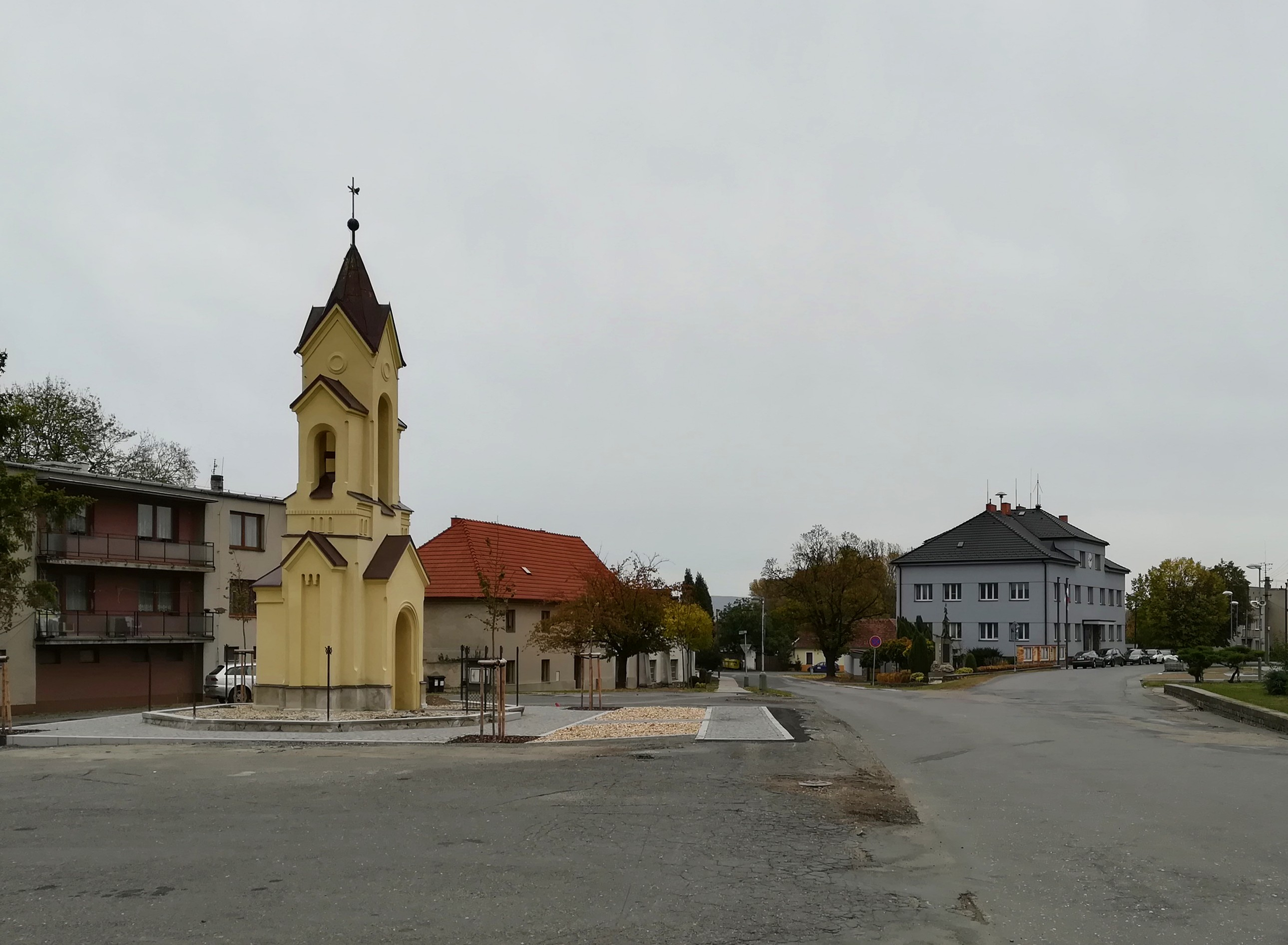
- Centre of Vrdy

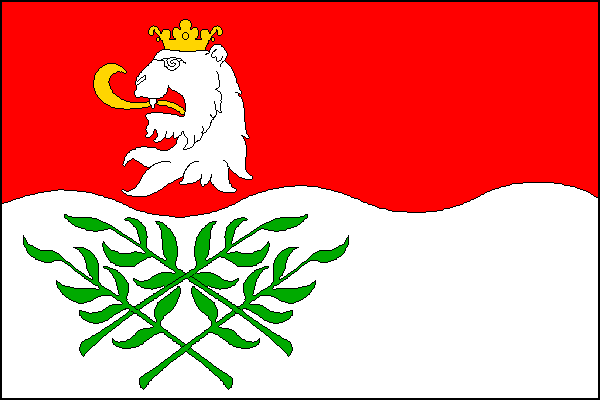
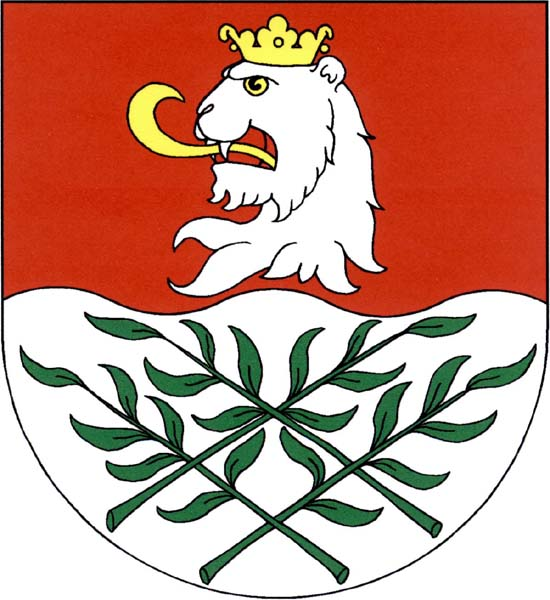
- Flag Coat of arms

- Location in the Czech Republic
- Coordinates: 49°55′18″N 15°28′21″E
- Country: Czech Republic
- Region: Central Bohemian
- District: Kutná Hora
- First mentioned: 1307

Area
  - Total: 18.49 km^{2} (7.14 sq mi)
- Elevation: 225 m (738 ft)

Population (2026-01-01)
  - Total: 3,104
  - Density: 167.9/km^{2} (434.8/sq mi)
- Time zone: UTC+1 (CET)
  - Summer (DST): UTC+2 (CEST)
- Postal codes: 285 71, 286 01
- Website: www.obecvrdy.cz

Vrdy (Czech pronunciation: [ˈvr̩dɪ]) is a municipality and village in Kutná Hora District in the Central Bohemian Region of the Czech Republic. It has about 3,100 inhabitants.

== Administrative division ==
Vrdy consists of four municipal parts (in brackets population according to the 2021 census):

- Vrdy (1,474)
- Dolní Bučice (857)
- Horní Bučice (306)
- Zbyslav (208)

== Etymology ==
The name Vrdy was probably derived from the Old Czech word vrd (i.e. 'stuttering person'), meaning "the village of stuttering people".

== Geography ==
Vrdy is located about 15 kilometres (9 mi) east of Kutná Hora and 24 km (15 mi) southwest of Pardubice. It lies in a flat agricultural landscape in the Central Elbe Table. The Doubrava River flows through the municipality.

== History ==
The first written mention of Vrdy is from 1307. Until the establishment of an independent municipality in 1849, Vrdy belonged to the Žleby estate and shared its owners. Dolní Bučice, Horní Bučice and Zbyslav were separate municipalities until 1960, when they were joined to Vrdy.

== Demographics ==
Historical population

| Year | Pop. | ±% |
|---|---|---|
| 1869 | 2,115 | — |
| 1880 | 2,797 | +32.2% |
| 1890 | 3,119 | +11.5% |
| 1900 | 3,096 | −0.7% |
| 1910 | 3,341 | +7.9% |

| Year | Pop. | ±% |
|---|---|---|
| 1921 | 3,175 | −5.0% |
| 1930 | 3,291 | +3.7% |
| 1950 | 2,532 | −23.1% |
| 1961 | 2,735 | +8.0% |
| 1970 | 2,585 | −5.5% |

| Year | Pop. | ±% |
|---|---|---|
| 1980 | 2,713 | +5.0% |
| 1991 | 2,821 | +4.0% |
| 2001 | 2,958 | +4.9% |
| 2011 | 2,884 | −2.5% |
| 2021 | 2,845 | −1.4% |

Source: Censuses

== Transport ==
The I/17 road (the section from Chrudim to Čáslav) runs through the municipality.

The railway line Čáslav–Třemošnice passes through the southern part of the municipal territory. There are two train stops: Vrdy-Koudelov and Skovice.

== Sights ==
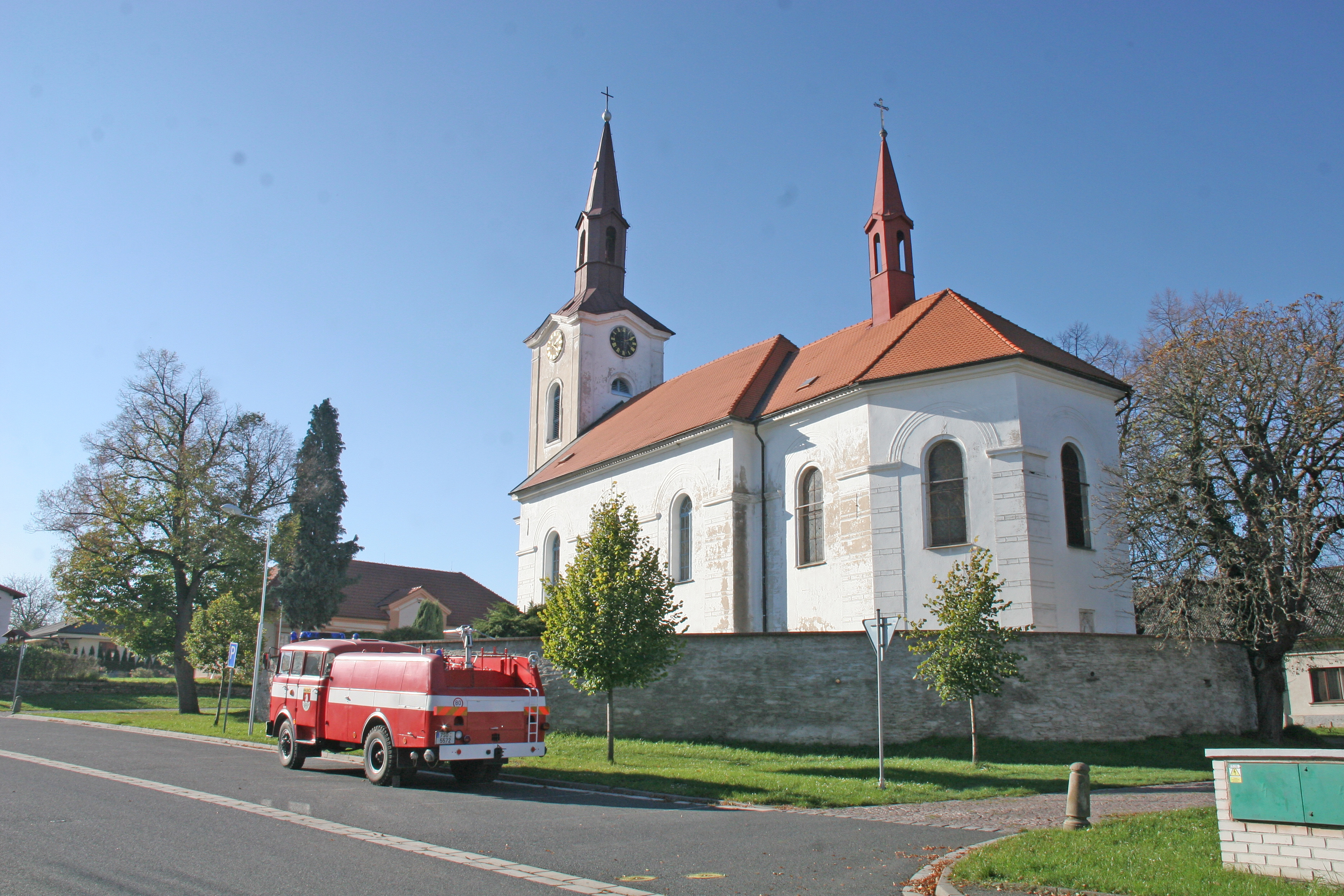
Church of All Saints

The most important monument is the Church of All Saints in Dolní Bučice. It is a late Neoclassical church from the mid-19th century. It was probably built on the site of a demolished medieval church.

== Notable people ==
- Karel Petr (1868–1950), mathematician
- Jiří Hanke (1924–2006), football player and manager
