= Thébault =

Thébault may refer to:

- 13775 Thébault, main belt asteroid with an orbital period of 4.39 years
- Alain Thébault (born 1962), French yachtsman
- Jacques Thébault (1924–2015), French comedian and voice actor
- Victor Thébault (1882–1960), French mathematician best known for propounding three problems in geometry
  - Thébault's theorem, a geometry problem he proposed
- Thébault, Dutch variant of Rugby football
