= Viktor Trkal =

Czech physicist (1888–1956)

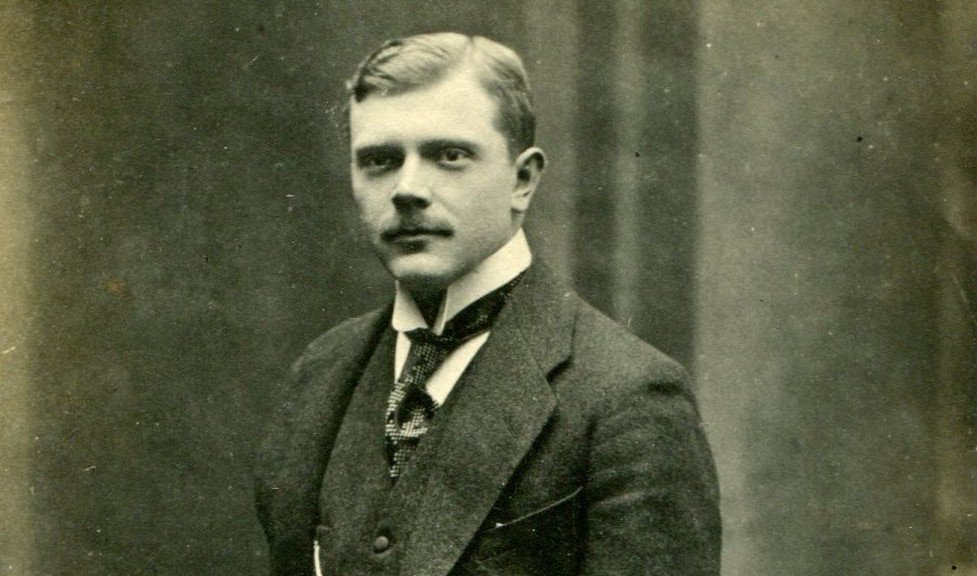
- Viktor Trkal before World War I
- Born: 14 August 1888; Ostřetín, Bohemia, Austria-Hungary
- Died: 3 September 1956 (aged 68); Prague, Czechoslovakia
- Education: University of Prague
- Known for: Trkalian flow
- Scientific career
- Fields: Physics
- Workplaces: University of Leiden, University of Prague, University of Perm

Viktor Trkal (14 August 1888 – 3 September 1956) was a Czech physicist and mathematician who specialized in theoretical quantum physics.

== Life and work ==
Trkal was born on 14 August 1888 in Ostřetín. He went to the Gymnasium in Vysoké Mýto. From 1906 to 1910, he studied mathematics and physics in Prague. His mathematics professors were Karel Petr, Jan Sobotka and later Bohumil Bydžovský. He attended physics lectures by Vincenc Strouhal, Bohumil Kučera, František Koláček and František Záviška. He obtained his doctorate in 1911 with a thesis on the Problem of Dirichlet and Neumann with integral equations. Then he did his one-year military service and afterwards taught at a business school in Prague in 1912–1914. During World War I Trkal was twice wounded and in March 1915 he was made prisoner of war by the Russians, after he first was considered dead but shouted "Don't shoot!" to a Russian soldier. He then stayed in several prison camps where he also contracted malaria. He wrote to Professor Orest Khvolson of Saint Petersburg. Thanks to his advocacy, Trkal was assigned to the new University of Perm in the Urals, where he obtained his habilitation qualification and became associate professor of mechanics and physics in 1918. After the war he returned to Czechoslovakia where he taught in high school and became a physics assistant to Professor Záviška. In the academic year October 1919 – June 1920, Trkal studied with Hendrik Antoon Lorentz and Paul Ehrenfest in Leiden, where he was Ehrenfest's assistant and met Albert Einstein. In 1921, he graduated from the University of Prague in theoretical physics. In 1922, he was appointed extraordinary and in 1929 a full professor of theoretical physics.

Trkal died on 3 September 1956 in Prague and is buried at the Prague's Olšany Cemetery.

== Trkalian flow ==
Trkalian flow is named after him. In 1919, Trkal published an article in Czech on the hydromechanics of viscous fluids where he addressed the simplification of the Navier-Stokes equations used in hydromechanics. The article reached scientists abroad, mainly in France, Norway and the United States. Norwegian physicist Oddvar Bjørgum introduced the term "Trkalian field". This term (or "Trkalian flow") is now commonly used in professional international literature.
