= Cross's theorem =

Equality of triangles between three squares

All of the red triangles have the same area.

In mathematics, specifically geometry, Cross's theorem, also known as Vecten's theorem, equates the area of a triangle to the area of each of the triangles formed by squares drawn along its sides.

== Theorem ==
Let $\triangle ABC$ be a triangle in the Euclidean plane. Suppose squares $DABE$, $FBCG$, and $HCAI$ are drawn on the outside of $\triangle ABC$. Then the areas of the four triangles $\triangle ABC$, $\triangle AID$, $\triangle BEF$, and $\triangle CGH$ are equal.

== Proofs ==
After the outer triangles are rotated, each has an equal base and height to the central triangle

=== Proof by rotation ===
Rotate $\triangle AID$ by a right angle, such that $D$ coincides with $B$, and let this new triangle be $\triangle AI'B$. It is clear that $|AC|=|AI'|$, and that $C$, $A$, and $I$ are collinear. Therefore, the areas of triangles $\triangle ABC$ and $\triangle AI'B$ are equal. Since $\triangle AI'B$ is simply a rotation of $\triangle AID$, it follows that $\triangle ABC$ and $\triangle AID$ have the same area. Similar arguments prove the equality of all four areas.

Angles of the same color are supplementary.

=== Proof by formula for area ===
Observe that $\angle CAB$ and $\angle DAI$ are supplementary. Therefore, we have

$$\begin{align}[]
[DAI] &= \frac12|AD||AI|\sin(\angle DAI) \\
&=\frac12|AB||AC|\sin(\angle CAB) \\
&= [ABC],
\end{align}$$

as desired. Similar arguments show all four areas are equal.

== History ==
Construction of the outer Vecten point.

The theorem is named after David Cross, who discovered it around 2004. This configuration was also studied independently by Vecten, and consequently the theorem may also be called Vecten's theorem. However, the name "Vecten's theorem" is more commonly used for the theorem stating the existence of the Vecten points of a triangle.

== See also ==
- Vecten points – Points formed by square centers
- Pythagorean theorem – Theorem relating areas of squares on the sides of a right-angled triangle.
- Bride's Chair – Illustration of Pythagorean theorem (and Cross's theorem without the flanks)
