= Bottema's theorem =

Theorem about the midpoint of a line connecting squares on two sides of a triangle

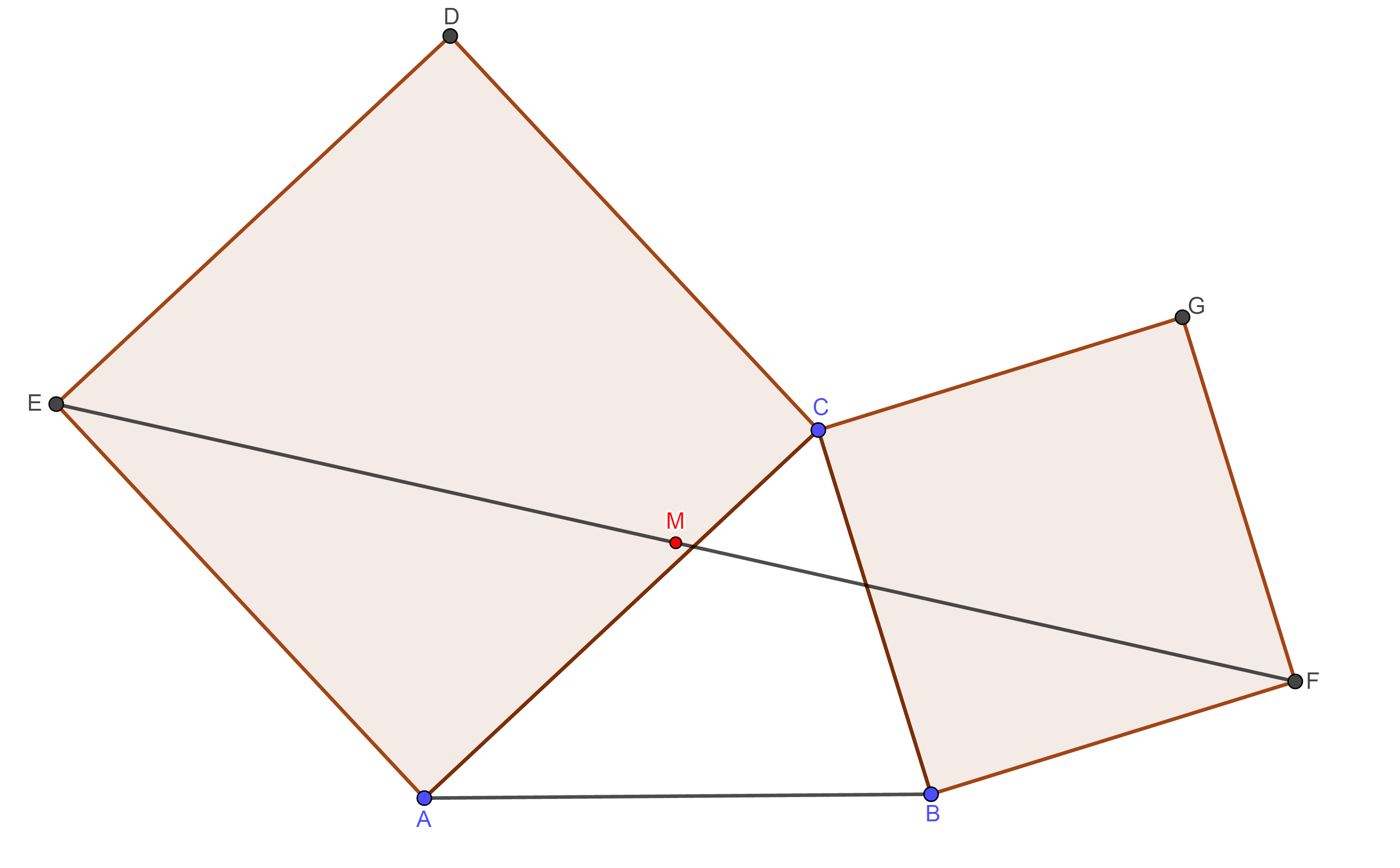
Bottema's theorem construction; changing the location of vertex $C$ changes the locations of vertices $E$ and $F$ but does not change the location of their midpoint $M$

Bottema's theorem is a theorem in plane geometry that is linked to the Dutch mathematician Oene Bottema (Groningen, 1901–1992). As Bottema points out himself, the theorem was known before he published the simple proof. The theorem is, for example, stated in the popular science book "One, Two, Three... Infinity" by theoretical physicist George Gamow.

The theorem can be stated as follows: in any given triangle $ABC$, construct squares on any two adjacent sides, for example $AC$ and $BC$. The midpoint of the line segment that connects the vertices of the squares opposite the common vertex, $C$, of the two sides of the triangle is independent of the location of $C$.

The theorem is true when the squares are constructed in one of the following ways:

- Looking at the figure, starting from the lower left vertex, $A$, follow the triangle vertices clockwise and construct the squares to the left of the sides of the triangle.
- Follow the triangle in the same way and construct the squares to the right of the sides of the triangle.

If $S$ is the projection of $M$ onto $AB$, Then $AS=BS=MS$.

If the squares are replaced by regular polygons of the same type, then a generalized Bottema theorem is obtained:

In any given triangle $ABC$ construct two regular polygons on two sides $AC$ and $BC$. Take the points $D_1$ and $D_2$ on the circumcircles of the polygons, which are diametrically opposed of the common vertex $C$. Then, the midpoint of the line segment $D_1D_2$ is independent of the location of $C$.

== See also ==
- Van Aubel's theorem
- Napoleon's theorem
