= 2661 Bydžovský =

Main-belt asteroid

Discovery
- Discovered by: Z. Vávrová
- Discovery site: Kleť Obs.
- Discovery date: 23 March 1982

Designations
- Named after: Bohumil Bydžovský (Czech academician)
- Alternative designations: 1982 FC_{1} · 1950 EE; 1969 TG_{4} · 1971 DO; 1974 SU_{2} · 1979 RM_{1}
- Minor planet category: main-belt · (outer)

Orbital characteristics
- Epoch 4 September 2017 (JD 2458000.5)
- Uncertainty parameter 0
- Observation arc: 66.89 yr (24,432 days)
- Aphelion: 3.3104 AU
- Perihelion: 2.7421 AU
- Semi-major axis: 3.0262 AU
- Eccentricity: 0.0939
- Orbital period (sidereal): 5.26 yr (1,923 days)
- Mean anomaly: 358.62°
- Mean motion: 0° 11^{m} 13.92^{s} / day
- Inclination: 9.9324°
- Longitude of ascending node: 321.14°
- Argument of perihelion: 115.55°

Physical characteristics
- Dimensions: 22±9 km (calculated); 30±2 km (est. at 0.06)
- Absolute magnitude (H): 11.4

2661 Bydžovský, provisional designation 1982 FC_{1}, is an asteroid from the outer region of the asteroid belt, approximately 30 kilometers in diameter. It was discovered on 23 March 1982, by Czech astronomer Zdeňka Vávrová at the South Bohemian Kleť Observatory in the Czech Republic. The asteroid was named after mathematician Bohumil Bydžovský.

== Orbit and classification ==
Bydžovský orbits the Sun in the outer main-belt at a distance of 2.7–3.3 AU once every 5 years and 3 months (1,923 days). Its orbit has an eccentricity of 0.09 and an inclination of 10° with respect to the ecliptic. It was first identified as 1950 EE at Heidelberg Observatory in 1950, extending the body's observation arc by 32 years prior to its discovery.

== Physical characteristics ==
As of 2016, Bydžovský's size, albedo, composition and rotation period remain unknown. Based on its absolute magnitude of 11.4, its diameter is estimated to measure between 13 and 32 kilometers, assuming an albedo in the range of 0.05 to 0.25. Since most asteroids in the outer main-belt are of a carbonaceous rather than of a silicaceous composition, with low albedos, typically closer to 0.05 than to 0.25, the asteroid's diameter might be on the upper end of NASA's published conversion table, as the lower the reflectivity (albedo), the larger the body's diameter for a given absolute magnitude.

== Naming ==
This minor planet was named in honour of mathematician Bohumil Bydžovský (1880–1969), chancellor of the Charles University in Prague. He was born in southern Bohemia and became the most eminent citizen of the Czech town Veselí on the Lužnice river, after which the minor planets 2321 Lužnice and 2599 Veselí were named, respectively. The official naming citation was published by the Minor Planet Center on 6 February 1993 (M.P.C. 21607).
