= Schořov =

- Municipality
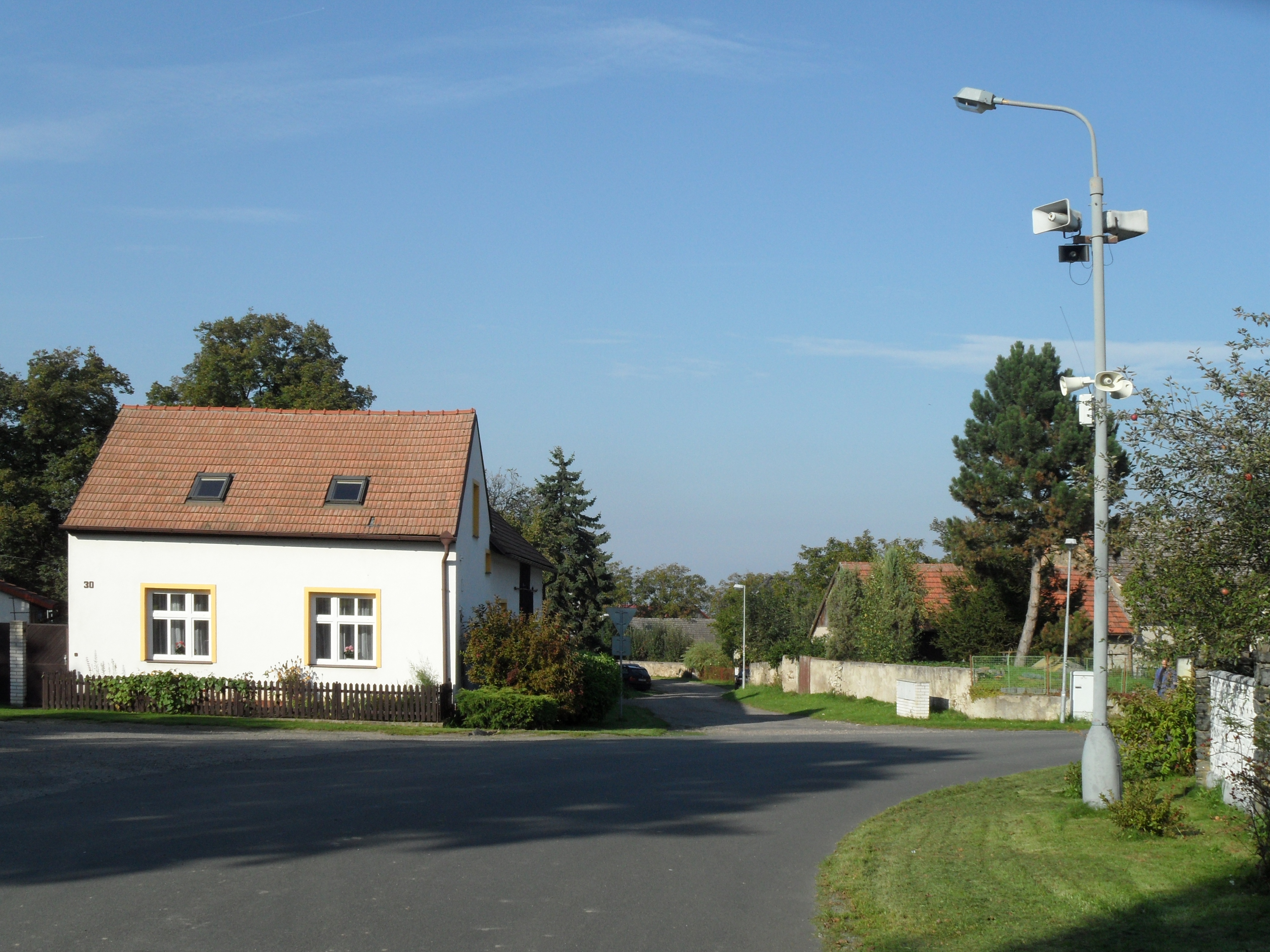
- Crossroads in Schořov

- Location in the Czech Republic
- Coordinates: 49°51′29″N 15°22′48″E
- Country: Czech Republic
- Region: Central Bohemian
- District: Kutná Hora
- First mentioned: 1352

Area
  - Total: 1.42 km^{2} (0.55 sq mi)
- Elevation: 321 m (1,053 ft)

Population (2026-01-01)
  - Total: 95
  - Density: 67/km^{2} (170/sq mi)
- Time zone: UTC+1 (CET)
  - Summer (DST): UTC+2 (CEST)
- Postal code: 286 01
- Website: www.schorov.cz

Schořov is a municipality and village in Kutná Hora District in the Central Bohemian Region of the Czech Republic. It has about 100 inhabitants.

== Etymology ==
The name is derived from the personal name Schoř, meaning "Schoř's (court)".

== Geography ==
Schořov is located about 13 kilometres (8 mi) southeast of Kutná Hora and 64 km (40 mi) southeast of Prague. It lies in a predominantly agricultural landscape in the Upper Sázava Hills. The highest point is at 347 m (1,138 ft) above sea level. The stream Hluboký potok flows through the municipality and supplies a nameless fishpond north of the village. In the centre of the village is a small pond called Náveský rybník.

== History ==
The first written mention of Schořov is from 1352. During the Thirty Years' War, the village was completely destroyed. It was renewed at the end of the 17th century. From 1739, Schořov was owned by the Auersperg family and was annexed to the Žleby estate.

== Demographics ==
Historical population

Year	Pop.	±%
1869	309	—
1880	299	−3.2%
1890	304	+1.7%
1900	260	−14.5%
1910	272	+4.6%

Year	Pop.	±%
1921	230	−15.4%
1930	239	+3.9%
1950	159	−33.5%
1961	157	−1.3%
1970	136	−13.4%

Year	Pop.	±%
1980	102	−25.0%
1991	77	−24.5%
2001	69	−10.4%
2011	67	−2.9%
2021	85	+26.9%

Source: Censuses

== Transport ==
There are no railways or major roads passing through the municipality.

== Sights ==
The main landmark of Schořov is the Chapel of the Assumption of the Virgin Mary. It was built in the early Baroque style at the end of the 17th century.
