= Thébault's theorem =

One of three theorems in geometry proved by French mathematician Victor Thébault

Thébault's 3 problems

Thébault's theorem is the name given variously to one of the geometry problems proposed by the French mathematician Victor Thébault, individually known as Thébault's problem I, II, and III.

== Thébault's problem I ==
Given any parallelogram, construct on its sides four squares external to the parallelogram. The quadrilateral formed by joining the centers of those four squares is a square.

It is a special case of van Aubel's theorem and a square version of Napoleon's theorem. All three of these theorems are just a special case of Petr–Douglas–Neumann theorem.

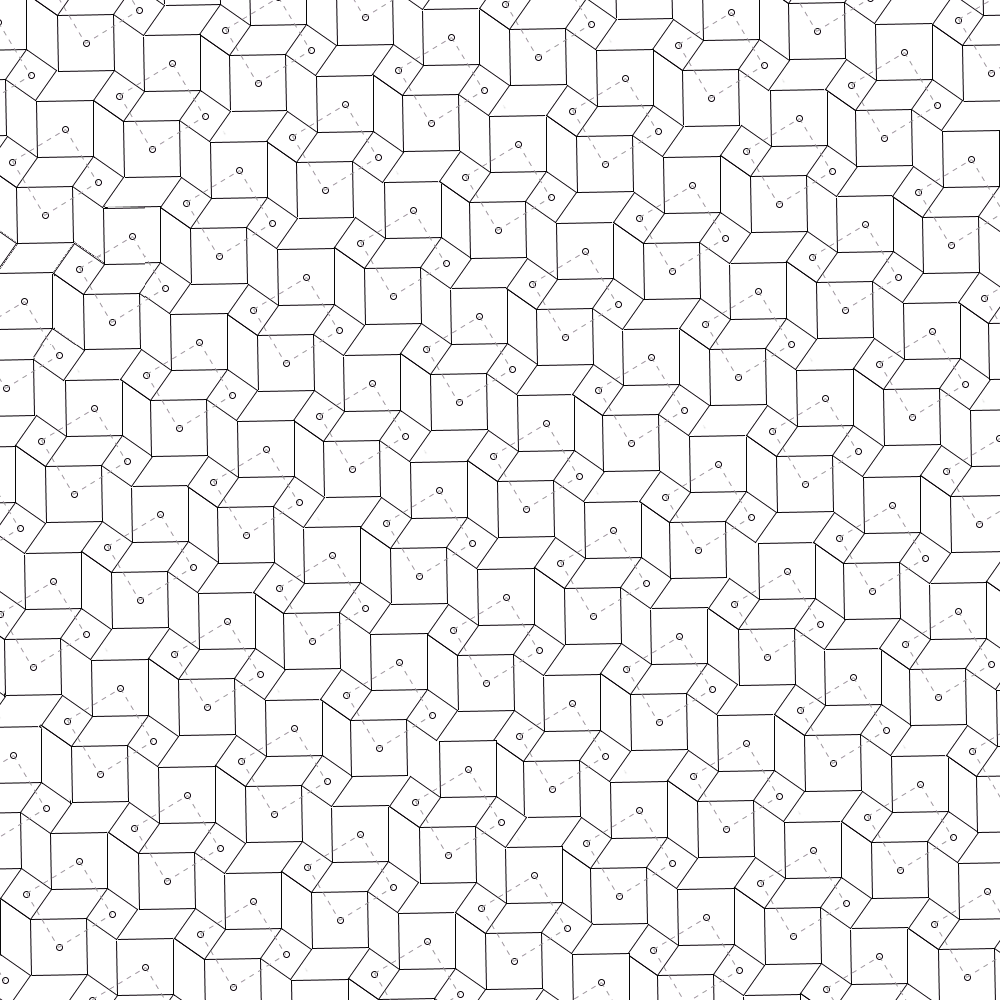
Tiling pattern based on Thébault's problem I

== Thébault's problem II ==
Given a square, construct equilateral triangles on two adjacent edges, either both inside or both outside the square. Then the triangle formed by joining the vertex of the square distant from both triangles and the vertices of the triangles distant from the square is equilateral.

== Thébault's problem III ==
Given any triangle ABC, and any point M on BC, construct the incircle and circumcircle of the triangle. Then construct two additional circles, each tangent to AM, BC, and to the circumcircle. Then their centers and the center of the incircle are collinear.

Until 2003, academia thought this third problem of Thébault the most difficult to prove. It was published in the American Mathematical Monthly in 1938, and proved by Dutch mathematician H. Streefkerk in 1973. However, in 2003, Jean-Louis Ayme discovered that Sawayama Yuzaburo, an instructor at The Central Military School of Tokyo, independently proposed and solved this problem in 1905.

An "external" version of this theorem, where the incircle is replaced by an excircle and the two additional circles are external to the circumcircle, is found in Shay Gueron (2002). A proof based on Casey's theorem is in the paper.
