= Ostřetín =

- Municipality
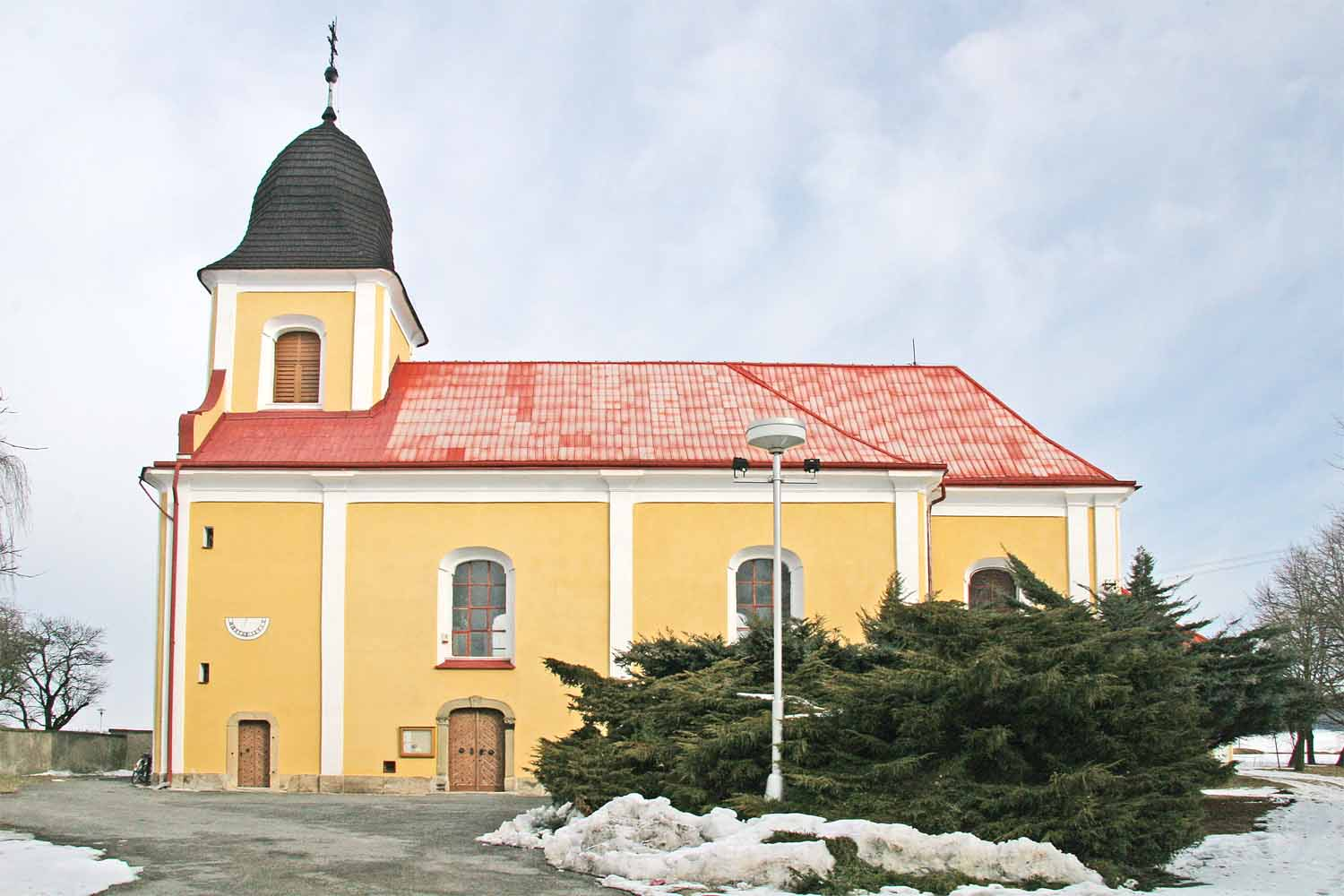
- Church of the Annunciation

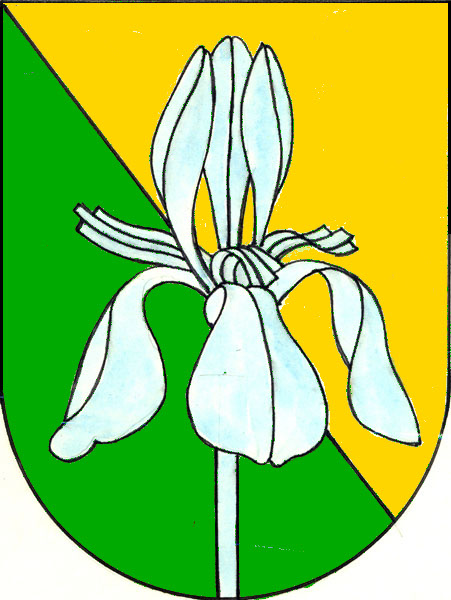
- Flag Coat of arms

- Location in the Czech Republic
- Coordinates: 50°2′41″N 16°1′50″E
- Country: Czech Republic
- Region: Pardubice
- District: Pardubice
- First mentioned: 1336

Area
  - Total: 18.50 km^{2} (7.14 sq mi)
- Elevation: 253 m (830 ft)

Population (2026-01-01)
  - Total: 917
  - Density: 49.6/km^{2} (128/sq mi)
- Time zone: UTC+1 (CET)
  - Summer (DST): UTC+2 (CEST)
- Postal code: 534 01
- Website: www.ostretin.cz

Ostřetín is a municipality and village in Pardubice District in the Pardubice Region of the Czech Republic. It has about 900 inhabitants.

== Administrative division ==
Ostřetín consists of two municipal parts (in brackets population according to the 2021 census):

- Ostřetín (724)
- Vysoká u Holic (168)

== Demographics ==
Historical population
Year	Pop.	±%
1869	1,187	—
1880	1,146	−3.5%
1890	1,182	+3.1%
1900	1,279	+8.2%
1910	1,295	+1.3%
1921	1,361	+5.1%
1930	1,411	+3.7%
1950	1,077	−23.7%
1961	1,098	+1.9%
1970	1,103	+0.5%
1980	1,069	−3.1%
1991	1,016	−5.0%
2001	967	−4.8%
2011	910	−5.9%
2021	892	−2.0%
Source: Censuses

== Notable people ==
- Viktor Trkal (1888–1956), physicist and mathematician
- Tomáš Koubek (born 1992), footballer
