= Jiří Hanke =

Czechoslovak footballer (1924–2006)

Personal information
- Full name: Jiří Hanke Hiron
- Date of birth: 12 December 1924
- Place of birth: Dolní Bučice, Czechoslovakia
- Date of death: 11 December 2006 (aged 81)
- Place of death: Lausanne, Switzerland
- Position: Striker

Senior career*
Years	Team	Apps	(Gls)
- Slavia Prague
1950	FC St. Pauli	0	
1951	Samarios	25	(5)
1951–1952	Lens	13	(2)
1952–1956	Barcelona	57	(5)
1956–1957	Condal	1	(0)
1957–1958	FC Biel	24	(2)

International career
1946–1949	Czechoslovakia	5	(0)

Managerial career
- 1957: FC Biel
- 1959–1960: Red Star
- 1962–1963: Xerxes Rotterdam
- 1974–1975: Vevey Sports
- * Club domestic league appearances and goals

Jiří Hanke (12 December 1924, Dolní Bučice – 11 December 2006, Lausanne), also known as Jorge Hanke or Georg Hanke, was a Czech footballer and later football manager, who played internationally for Czechoslovakia, earning five caps.

In the close season of 1950 he joined FC St. Pauli where he played a few friendlies but the club failed to get him eligible for league matches. Hanke had a spell in Colombia with Samarios during the 1951 season, and later, in France where he resurfaced at RC Lens.

He coached FC Biel, Red Star, Xerxes Rotterdam and Vevey Sports.

== Bibliography ==
- Barreaud, Marc (1998). Dictionnaire des footballeurs étrangers du championnat professionnel français (1932–1997). L'Harmattan, Paris. ISBN 2-7384-6608-7.
- Malherbe, Jean-Pierre; De Dekker, Guy (2011). Swiss League Players' Record Ligue Nationale A 1933/1934 to 2007/2008. Heart Books, Rijmenam (Bonheiden), Belgium.
