= Zdeňka Vávrová =

Czech astronomer

Minor planets discovered: 115
see § List of discovered minor planets

Zdeňka Vávrová (born 1945) is a Czech astronomer.

She co-discovered periodic comet 134P/Kowal-Vávrová. She had observed it as an asteroid, which received the provisional designation 1983 JG, without seeing any cometary coma. However, later images by Charles T. Kowal showed a coma. The Minor Planet Center credits her with the discovery of 115 numbered minor planets.

The Florian main-belt asteroid 3364 Zdenka, discovered by Antonín Mrkos in 1984, was named in her honor and for the 20 years she had been participating in Kleť Observatory's minor planet astrometry program. Naming citation was published on 26 February 1994 (M.P.C. 23136).

== List of discovered minor planets ==
List of minor planets

2315 Czechoslovakia	19 February 1980	list
2321 Lužnice	19 February 1980	list
2365 Interkosmos	30 December 1980	list
2390 Nežárka	14 August 1980	list
2442 Corbett	3 October 1980	list
2474 Ruby	14 August 1979	list
2522 Triglav	6 August 1980	list
2523 Ryba	6 August 1980	list
2524 Budovicium	28 August 1981	list
2544 Gubarev	6 August 1980	list

2568 Maksutov	13 April 1980	list
2581 Radegast	11 November 1980	list
2599 Veselí	29 September 1980	list
2620 Santana	3 October 1980	list
2647 Sova	29 September 1980	list
2661 Bydžovský	23 March 1982	list
2706 Borovský	11 November 1980	list
2766 Leeuwenhoek	23 March 1982	list
2781 Kleczek	19 August 1982	list
2821 Slávka	24 September 1978	list

3022 Dobermann	16 September 1980	list
3069 Heyrovský	16 October 1982	list
3096 Bezruč	28 August 1981	list
3149 Okudzhava	22 September 1981	list
3479 Malaparte	3 October 1980	list
3515 Jindra	16 October 1982	list
3592 Nedbal	15 February 1980	list
3628 Božněmcová	25 November 1979	list
3732 Vávra	27 September 1984	list
3735 Třeboň	4 December 1983	list

3879 Machar	16 August 1983	list
3978 Klepešta	7 November 1983	list
4114 Jasnorzewska	19 August 1982	list
4124 Herriot	29 September 1986	list
4142 Dersu-Uzala	28 May 1981	list
4170 Semmelweis	6 August 1980	list
4250 Perun	20 October 1984	list
4317 Garibaldi	19 February 1980	list
4318 Baťa	21 February 1980	list
4781 Sládkovič	3 October 1980	list

4921 Volonté	29 September 1980	list
4927 O'Connell	21 October 1982	list
5031 Švejcar	16 March 1990	list
5203 Pavarotti	27 September 1984	list
5228 Máca	3 November 1986	list
5275 Zdislava	28 October 1986	list
5327 Gertwilkens	5 March 1989	list
5364 Christophschäfer	2 September 1980	list
5423 Horahořejš	16 February 1983	list
5514 Karelraška	29 January 1989	list

5548 Thosharriot	3 October 1980	list
5574 Seagrave	20 March 1984	list
5844 Chlupáč	28 October 1986	list
5860 Deankoontz	28 August 1981	list
5893 Coltrane	15 March 1982	list
5895 Žbirka	16 October 1982	list
(5901) 1986 WB_{1}	25 November 1986	list
6059 Diefenbach	11 October 1979	list
(6067) 1990 QR_{11}	28 August 1990	list
6077 Messner	3 October 1980	list

6086 Vrchlický	15 November 1987	list
6126 Hubelmatt	5 March 1989	list
6176 Horrigan	16 January 1985	list
6230 Fram	27 September 1984	list
6234 Sheilawolfman	30 September 1986	list
6248 Bardon	17 January 1991	list
6263 Druckmüller	6 August 1980	list
(6264) 1980 SQ	29 September 1980	list
6301 Bohumilruprecht	29 January 1989	list
(6369) 1983 UC	16 October 1983	list

(6476) 1987 VT	15 November 1987	list
(6507) 1982 QD	18 August 1982	list
6539 Nohavica	19 August 1982	list
6544 Stevendick	29 September 1986	list
(6593) 1986 UV	28 October 1986	list
(6624) 1980 SG	16 September 1980	list
(6627) 1981 FT	27 March 1981	list
6692 Antonínholý	18 April 1985	list
6697 Celentano	24 April 1987	list
6700 Kubišová	12 January 1988	list

6822 Horálek	28 October 1986	list
7076 Divnýjanko	30 October 1980	list
7175 Janegoodall	11 October 1988	list
7221 Sallaba	22 September 1981	list
7272 Darbydyar	21 February 1980	list
(7325) 1981 QA_{1}	28 August 1981	list
(7374) 1980 DL	19 February 1980	list
(7375) 1980 PZ	14 August 1980	list
(7384) 1981 TJ	6 October 1981	list
(7395) 1985 RP_{1}	10 September 1985	list

7984 Marius	29 September 1980	list
(8259) 1983 UG	16 October 1983	list
8617 Fellous	6 August 1980	list
(9160) 1986 UH_{3}	28 October 1986	list
(9166) 1987 SC_{6}	21 September 1987	list
(9290) 1981 TT	6 October 1981	list
(9296) 1983 RB_{2}	5 September 1983	list
(9835) 1984 UD	17 October 1984	list
9841 Mašek	18 October 1988	list
10040 Ghillar	24 August 1984	list

11475 Velinský	11 November 1982	list
(11822) 1981 TK	6 October 1981	list
(13483) 1980 SF	16 September 1980	list
(14356) 1987 SF_{6}	21 September 1987	list
(15226) 1986 UP	28 October 1986	list
(16400) 1984 SS_{1}	27 September 1984	list
(16412) 1986 WZ	25 November 1986	list
(18303) 1980 PU	6 August 1980	list
(18345) 1989 UP_{4}	22 October 1989	list
(19133) 1988 PC_{2}	7 August 1988	list

(22261) 1980 AB	13 January 1980	list
(32777) 1987 QF_{1}	21 August 1987	list
(43762) 1986 WC_{1}	25 November 1986	list
(55736) 1987 QC_{1}	21 August 1987	list
(58109) 1980 PQ	6 August 1980	list

== See also ==
- List of minor planet discoverers § Z. Vavrova
