= Hermann Zwierzina =

Czech politician (1825–1873)

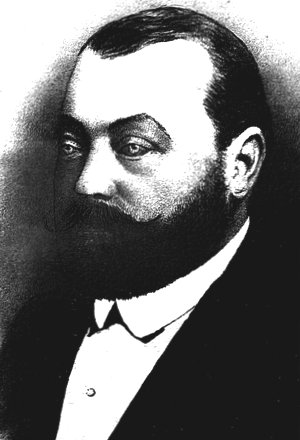
Hermann Zwierzina

Hermann Zwierzina (12 October 1825 in Třemošnice, Bohemia – 19 June 1873 in Mariánské Lázně) was the first mayor of Ostrava, holding office from 1861 to 1864.

He was born the only son of metal works owner Josef Zwierzina. From 1836 to 1840, he studied at the German gymnasium in Olomouc. Then he studied at the Vienna polytechnical school. In 1844, he began working as a mining clerk in the Rothschild mines in the Ostrava region. In 1858, upon his father's death, he took over managing his father's two mines.

He entered local politics in the 1860s, being elected the first mayor of Moravská Ostrava in 1861. He also served as a member of the provincial assembly in Brno. During his tenure he attempted to open an intermediate school but was unsuccessful. He did not run for reelection in 1865. He was succeeded by Alois Anderka.

He died of typhoid fever on 19 July 1873 in Mariánské Lázně. His remains were transferred to Moravská Ostrava and were interred at the cemetery four days later.

Political offices
Preceded by -	Mayor of Ostrava; 1861–1864	Succeeded by Alois Anderka
