= Nové Lublice =

- Municipality
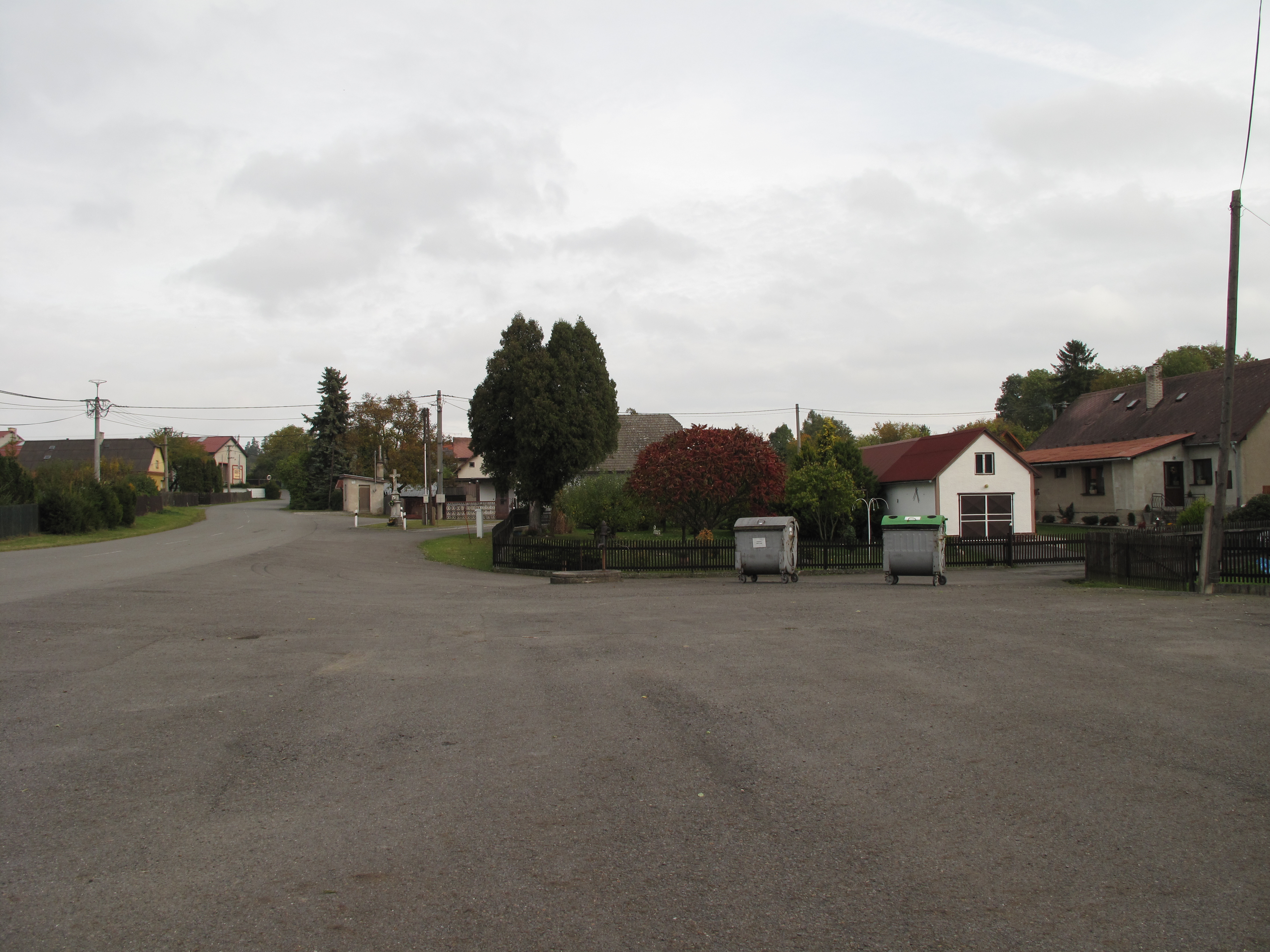
- Centre of Nové Lublice

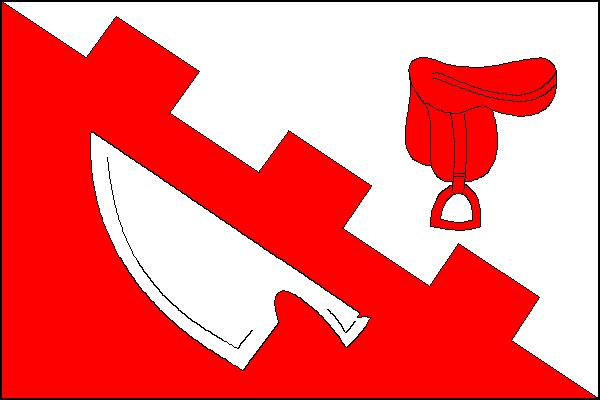
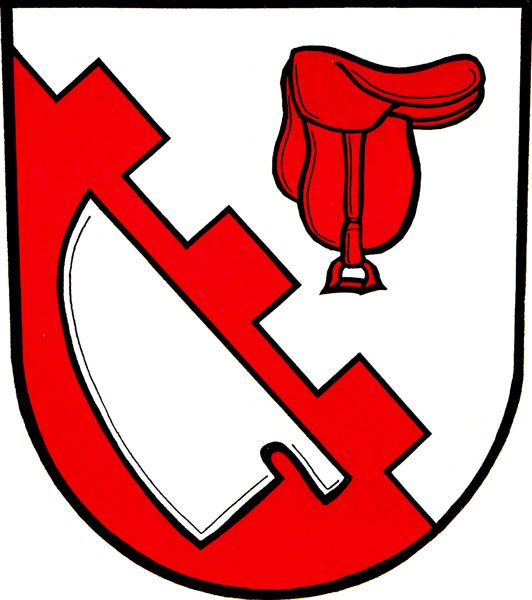
- Flag Coat of arms

- Location in the Czech Republic
- Coordinates: 49°51′46″N 17°40′41″E
- Country: Czech Republic
- Region: Moravian-Silesian Region
- District: Opava
- First mentioned: 1588

Area
  - Total: 6.87 km^{2} (2.65 sq mi)
- Elevation: 520 m (1,710 ft)

Population (2026-01-01)
  - Total: 186
  - Density: 27.1/km^{2} (70.1/sq mi)
- Time zone: UTC+1 (CET)
  - Summer (DST): UTC+2 (CEST)
- Postal code: 749 01
- Website: www.novelublice.cz

Nové Lublice is a municipality and village in Opava District in the Moravian-Silesian Region of the Czech Republic. It has about 200 inhabitants.

== History ==
The first written mention of Nové Lublice is from 1588.

== Demographics ==
Historical population
Year	Pop.	±%
1869	609	—
1880	596	−2.1%
1890	542	−9.1%
1900	495	−8.7%
1910	513	+3.6%
1921	482	−6.0%
1930	453	−6.0%
1950	288	−36.4%
1961	304	+5.6%
1970	284	−6.6%
1980	255	−10.2%
1991	225	−11.8%
2001	220	−2.2%
2011	205	−6.8%
2021	177	−13.7%
Source: Censuses

== Notable people ==
- Alois Anderka (1825–1886), politician, mayor of Ostrava
