= Napoleon points =

Point pair associated with plane triangles

In geometry, Napoleon points are a pair of special points associated with a plane triangle. It is generally believed that the existence of these points was discovered by Napoleon Bonaparte, the Emperor of the French from 1804 to 1815, but many have questioned this belief. The Napoleon points are triangle centers and they are listed as the points X(17) and X(18) in Clark Kimberling's Encyclopedia of Triangle Centers.

The name "Napoleon points" has also been applied to a different pair of triangle centers, better known as the isodynamic points.

== Definition of the points ==
=== First Napoleon point ===
First Napoleon point

Let △ABC be any given plane triangle. On the sides BC, CA, AB of the triangle, construct outwardly drawn equilateral triangles △DBC, △ECA, △FAB respectively. Let the centroids of these triangles be X, Y, Z respectively. Then the lines AX, BY, CZ are concurrent. The point of concurrence N_{1} is the first Napoleon point, or the outer Napoleon point, of the triangle △ABC.

The triangle △XYZ is called the outer Napoleon triangle of △ABC. Napoleon's theorem asserts that this triangle is an equilateral triangle.

In Clark Kimberling's Encyclopedia of Triangle Centers, the first Napoleon point is denoted by X(17).

- The trilinear coordinates of N_{1}:
  $$\begin{align}
& \csc(A + \tfrac{\pi}{6}) :  \csc(B + \tfrac{\pi}{6}) :  \csc(C + \tfrac{\pi}{6}) \\[2pt]
=\ & \sec(A -\tfrac{\pi}{3}) :  \sec(B -\tfrac{\pi}{3}) :  \sec(C - \tfrac{\pi}{3})
\end{align}$$
- The barycentric coordinates of N_{1}:
  $$a \csc(A + \tfrac{\pi}{6}) : b \csc(B + \tfrac{\pi}{6}) : c \csc(C + \tfrac{\pi}{6})$$

=== Second Napoleon point ===
Second Napoleon point

Let △ABC be any given plane triangle. On the sides BC, CA, AB of the triangle, construct inwardly drawn equilateral triangles △DBC, △ECA, △FAB respectively. Let the centroids of these triangles be X, Y, Z respectively. Then the lines AX, BY, CZ are concurrent. The point of concurrence N_{2} is the second Napoleon point, or the inner Napoleon point, of △ABC.

The triangle △XYZ is called the inner Napoleon triangle of △ABC. Napoleon's theorem asserts that this triangle is an equilateral triangle.

In Clark Kimberling's Encyclopedia of Triangle Centers, the second Napoleon point is denoted by X(18).

- The trilinear coordinates of N_{2}:
  $$\begin{align}
& \csc(A - \tfrac{\pi}{6}) : \csc(B - \tfrac{\pi}{6}) : \csc(C - \tfrac{\pi}{6}) \\[2pt]
=\ & \sec(A + \tfrac{\pi}{3}) : \sec(B + \tfrac{\pi}{3}) : \sec(C + \tfrac{\pi}{3})
\end{align}$$
- The barycentric coordinates of N_{2}:
  $$a \csc(A - \tfrac{\pi}{6}) : b \csc(B -\tfrac{\pi}{6}) : c \csc(C - \tfrac{\pi}{6})$$

Two points closely related to the Napoleon points are the Fermat-Torricelli points (ETC's X(13) and X(14)). If instead of constructing lines joining the equilateral triangles' centroids to the respective vertices one now constructs lines joining the equilateral triangles' apices to the respective vertices of the triangle, the three lines so constructed are again concurrent. The points of concurrence are called the Fermat-Torricelli points, sometimes denoted F_{1} and F_{2}. The intersection of the Fermat line (i.e., that line joining the two Fermat-Torricelli points) and the Napoleon line (i.e., that line joining the two Napoleon points) is the triangle's symmedian point (ETC's X(6)).

== Generalizations ==
The results regarding the existence of the Napoleon points can be generalized in different ways. In defining the Napoleon points we begin with equilateral triangles drawn on the sides of △ABC and then consider the centers X, Y, Z of these triangles. These centers can be thought as the vertices of isosceles triangles erected on the sides of triangle ABC with the base angles equal to π/6 (30 degrees). The generalizations seek to determine other triangles that, when erected over the sides of △ABC, have concurrent lines joining their external vertices and the vertices of △ABC.

=== Isosceles triangles ===
A point on the Kiepert hyperbola.

Kiepert hyperbola of △ABC. The hyperbola passes through the vertices A, B, C, the orthocenter O and the centroid G of the triangle.

This generalization asserts the following:

If the three triangles △XBC, △YCA, △ZAB, constructed on the sides of the given triangle △ABC as bases, are similar, isosceles and similarly situated, then the lines AX, BY, CZ concur at a point N.

If the common base angle is θ, then the vertices of the three triangles have the following trilinear coordinates.
$$\begin{array}{rccccc}
X= & -\sin\theta &:& \sin(C + \theta) &:& \sin(B + \theta) \\
Y= & \sin(C + \theta) &:& -\sin\theta &:& \sin(A + \theta) \\
Z=&  \sin(B + \theta) &:& \sin(A + \theta) &:& -\sin\theta
\end{array}$$

The trilinear coordinates of N are
$$\csc(A + \theta) : \csc(B + \theta) : \csc(C + \theta)$$

A few special cases are interesting.

Value of θ	The point N
$0$	G, the centroid of △ABC
$\frac \pi 2, -\frac \pi 2$	O, the orthocenter of △ABC
$\frac \pi 4, -\frac \pi 4$	The Vecten points
$\frac \pi 6$	N_{1}, the first Napoleon point X(17)
$- \frac \pi 6$	N_{2}, the second Napoleon point X(18)
$\frac \pi 3$	F_{1}, the first Fermat–Torricelli point X(13)
$-\frac \pi 3$	F_{2}, the second Fermat–Torricelli point X(14)
$$\begin{cases} -A & \text{if } A < \pi/2 \\ \pi - A & \text{if } A > \pi/2 \end{cases}$$	The vertex A
$$\begin{cases} -B & \text{if } B < \pi/2 \\ \pi - B & \text{if } B > \pi/2 \end{cases}$$	The vertex B
$$\begin{cases} -C & \text{if } C < \pi/2 \\ \pi - C & \text{if } C > \pi/2 \end{cases}$$	The vertex C

Moreover, the locus of N as the base angle θ varies between −π/2 and π/2 is the conic

$$\frac{\sin(B-C)} x  + \frac{\sin(C-A)} y  + \frac{\sin(A-B)} z = 0.$$

This conic is a rectangular hyperbola and it is called the Kiepert hyperbola in honor of Ludwig Kiepert (1846–1934), the mathematician who discovered this result. This hyperbola is the unique conic which passes through the five points A, B, C, G, O.

=== Similar triangles ===
Generalization of Napoleon point: A special case

The three triangles △XBC, △YCA, △ZAB erected over the sides of the triangle △ABC need not be isosceles for the three lines AX, BY, CZ to be concurrent.

If similar triangles △XBC, △AYC, △ABZ are constructed outwardly on the sides of any triangle △ABC then the lines AX, BY, CZ are concurrent.

=== Arbitrary triangles ===
The concurrence of the lines AX, BY, CZ holds even in much relaxed conditions. The following result states one of the most general conditions for the lines AX, BY, CZ to be concurrent.

If triangles △XBC, △YCA, △ZAB are constructed outwardly on the sides of any triangle △ABC such that

$$\angle CBX = \angle ABZ, \quad \angle ACY = \angle BCX, \quad \angle BAZ = \angle CAY;$$

then the lines AX, BY, CZ are concurrent.

The point of concurrency is known as the Jacobi point.

A generalization of Napoleon point

== History ==
Coxeter and Greitzer state the Napoleon Theorem thus: If equilateral triangles are erected externally on the sides of any triangle, their centers form an equilateral triangle. They observe that Napoleon Bonaparte was a bit of a mathematician with a great interest in geometry. However, they doubt whether Napoleon knew enough geometry to discover the theorem attributed to him.

The earliest recorded appearance of the result embodied in Napoleon's theorem is in an article in The Ladies' Diary appeared in 1825. The Ladies' Diary was an annual periodical which was in circulation in London from 1704 to 1841. The result appeared as part of a question posed by W. Rutherford, Woodburn.

VII. Quest.(1439); by Mr. W. Rutherford, Woodburn." Describe equilateral triangles (the vertices being either all outward or all inward) upon the three sides of any triangle ABC: then the lines which join the centers of gravity of those three equilateral triangles will constitute an equilateral triangle. Required a demonstration."

However, there is no reference to the existence of the so-called Napoleon points in this question. Christoph J. Scriba, a German historian of mathematics, has studied the problem of attributing the Napoleon points to Napoleon in a paper in Historia Mathematica.

== See also ==
- Triangle center
- Triangle conic
- Napoleon's theorem
- Napoleon's problem
- Van Aubel's theorem
- Fermat point
