= 2442 Corbett =

Asteroid

Discovery
- Discovered by: Z. Vávrová
- Discovery site: Kleť Obs.
- Discovery date: 3 October 1980

Designations
- Named after: Jim Corbett (Hunter and author)
- Alternative designations: 1980 TO · 1928 RA; 1942 GE · 1951 YN_{1} 1954 QO · 1971 BB_{3} 1976 QZ
- Minor planet category: main-belt · Vestoid

Orbital characteristics
- Epoch 4 September 2017 (JD 2458000.5)
- Uncertainty parameter 0
- Observation arc: 74.50 yr (27,210 days)
- Aphelion: 2.6677 AU
- Perihelion: 2.1081 AU
- Semi-major axis: 2.3879 AU
- Eccentricity: 0.1172
- Orbital period (sidereal): 3.69 yr (1,348 days)
- Mean anomaly: 75.911°
- Mean motion: 0° 16^{m} 1.56^{s} / day
- Inclination: 5.0957°
- Longitude of ascending node: 190.64°
- Argument of perihelion: 104.22°

Physical characteristics
- Dimensions: 8.327±0.384 km 8.57 km (calculated)
- Synodic rotation period: 10 h 11.453±0.1173 h
- Geometric albedo: 0.20 (assumed); 0.255±0.043
- Spectral type: V
- Absolute magnitude (H): 12.416±0.003 (R) · 12.50 · 12.656±0.001 (R) · 12.7 · 12.85±0.47

2442 Corbett, provisional designation 1980 TO, is a vestoid asteroid from the inner regions of the asteroid belt, approximately 8.5 kilometers in diameter. It was discovered on 3 October 1980, by Czech astronomer Zdeňka Vávrová at Kleť Observatory, now in the Czech Republic. It is named after British-Indian hunter Jim Corbett.

== Orbit and classification ==
Corbett is a V-type asteroid that orbits the Sun in the inner main-belt at a distance of 2.1–2.7 AU once every 3 years and 8 months (1,348 days). Its orbit has an eccentricity of 0.12 and an inclination of 5° with respect to the ecliptic. First identified as 1928 RA at Heidelberg in 1928, the body's observation arc begins in 1944, when it was identified as 1942 GE at Turku Observatory in Finland, 36 years prior to its official discovery observation at Klet.

== Rotation period ==
A rotational lightcurve of Corbett was obtained from photometric observations by French amateur astronomer René Roy in July 2009. Lightcurve analysis gave a rotation period of 10 hours with a brightness amplitude of 0.12 magnitude (U=2).

Photometric observations in the R-band at the Palomar Transient Factory in 2010 and 2013, gave a divergent period of 11.453 (U=2) and 49.507 (U=1) hours with an amplitude of 0.19 and 0.10 magnitude, respectively.

== Diameter and albedo ==
According to the survey carried out by NASA's Wide-field Infrared Survey Explorer with its subsequent NEOWISE mission, Corbett measures 8.327 kilometers in diameter and its surface has an albedo of 0.255, while the Collaborative Asteroid Lightcurve Link assumes a standard albedo of stony asteroids of 0.20 and calculates a diameter of 8.57 kilometers with an absolute magnitude of 12.7.

== Naming ==
This minor planet was named in memory of British-Indian Jim Corbett (1875–1955), born in Nainital, India. Corbett was a colonel in the British Indian Army and a hunter of man-eating tigers and leopards in India, who became a nature conservationist, naturalist and author. He is known for his 1944 hunting biography Man-Eaters of Kumaon. The approved naming citation was published by the Minor Planet Center on 8 February 1982 (M.P.C. 6650).
