= Petr–Douglas–Neumann theorem =

Theorem in geometry

In geometry, the Petr–Douglas–Neumann theorem (or the PDN-theorem) is a result concerning arbitrary planar polygons. The theorem asserts that a certain procedure when applied to an arbitrary polygon always yields a regular polygon having the same number of sides as the initial polygon. The theorem was first published by Karel Petr (1868–1950) of Prague in 1905 (in Czech) and in 1908 (in German). It was independently rediscovered by Jesse Douglas (1897–1965) in 1940 and also by B H Neumann (1909–2002) in 1941. The naming of the theorem as Petr–Douglas–Neumann theorem, or as the PDN-theorem for short, is due to Stephen B Gray. It has also been called Douglas's theorem, the Douglas–Neumann theorem, the Napoleon–Douglas–Neumann theorem and Petr's theorem.

The PDN-theorem is a generalisation of Napoleon's theorem, which corresponds to the case of triangles, and van Aubel's theorem which corresponds to the case of quadrilaterals.

== Statement of the theorem ==
The Petr–Douglas–Neumann theorem asserts the following.

If isosceles triangles with apex angles 2kπ/n, for an integer k with 1 ≤ k ≤ n − 2 are erected on the sides of an arbitrary n-gon A_{0}, whose apices are the vertices of a new n-gon A_{1}, and if this process is repeated n-2 times, but with a different value of k for the n-gon formed from the free apices of these triangles at each step, until all values 1 ≤ k ≤ n − 2 have been used (in arbitrary order), to form a sequence A_{1}, A_{2}, ... A_{n-2}, of n-gons, their centroids all coincide with the centroid of A_{0}, and the last one, A_{n−2} is a regular n-gon . (Note: Here, "centroid" is meant the vertex centroid.)

== Specialisation to triangles ==
Diagram illustrating the fact that Napoleon's theorem is a special case of Petr–Douglas–Neumann theorem.

In the case of triangles, the value of n is 3 and that of n − 2 is 1. Hence there is only one possible value for k, namely 1. The specialisation of the theorem to triangles asserts that the triangle A_{1} is a regular 3-gon, that is, an equilateral triangle.

A_{1} is formed by the apices of the isosceles triangles with apex angle 2π/3 erected over the sides of the triangle A_{0}. The vertices of A_{1} are the centers of equilateral triangles erected over the sides of triangle A_{0}. Thus the specialisation of the PDN theorem to a triangle can be formulated as follows:

If equilateral triangles are erected over the sides of any triangle, then the triangle formed by the centers of the three equilateral triangles is equilateral.

The last statement is the assertion of the Napoleon's theorem.

== Specialisation to quadrilaterals ==
In the case of quadrilaterals, the value of n is 4 and that of n − 2 is 2. There are two possible values for k, namely 1 and 2, and so two possible apex angles, namely:

(2×1×π)/4 = π/2 = 90° ( corresponding to k = 1 )
(2×2×π)/4 = π = 180° ( corresponding to k = 2 ).

According to the PDN-theorem the quadrilateral A_{2} is a regular 4-gon, that is, a square. The two-stage process yielding the square A_{2} can be carried out in two different ways. (The apex Z of an isosceles triangle with apex angle π erected over a line segment XY is the midpoint of the line segment XY.)

=== Construct A_{1} using apex angle π/2 and then A_{2} with apex angle π. ===
In this case the vertices of A_{1} are the free apices of isosceles triangles with apex angles π/2 erected over the sides of the quadrilateral A_{0}. The vertices of the quadrilateral A_{2} are the midpoints of the sides of the quadrilateral A_{1}. By the PDN theorem, A_{2} is a square.

The vertices of the quadrilateral A_{1} are the centers of squares erected over the sides of the quadrilateral A_{0}. The assertion that quadrilateral A_{2} is a square is equivalent to the assertion that the diagonals of A_{1} are equal and perpendicular to each other. The latter assertion is the content of van Aubel's theorem.

Thus van Aubel's theorem is a special case of the PDN-theorem.

=== Construct A_{1} using apex angle π and then A_{2} with apex angle π/2. ===
In this case the vertices of A_{1} are the midpoints of the sides of the quadrilateral A_{0} and those of A_{2} are the apices of the triangles with apex angles π/2 erected over the sides of A_{1}. The PDN-theorem asserts that A_{2} is a square in this case also.

=== Images illustrating application of the theorem to quadrilaterals ===
Petr–Douglas–Neumann theorem as applied to a quadrilateral A_{0} = ABCD. A_{1} = EFGH is constructed using apex angle π/2 and A_{2} = PQRS with apex angle π.	Petr–Douglas–Neumann theorem as applied to a quadrilateral A_{0} = ABCD. A_{1} = EFGH is constructed using apex angle π and A_{2} = PQRS with apex angle π/2.

Petr–Douglas–Neumann theorem as applied to a self-intersecting quadrilateral A_{0} = ABCD. A_{1} = EFGH is constructed using apex angle π/2 and A_{2} = PQRS with apex angle π.	Petr–Douglas–Neumann theorem as applied to a self-intersecting quadrilateral A_{0} = ABCD. A_{1} = EFGH is constructed using apex angle π and A_{2} = PQRS with apex angle π/2.

Diagram illustrating the fact that van Aubel's theorem is
a special case of Petr–Douglas–Neumann theorem.

== Specialisation to pentagons ==
Diagram illustrating Petr–Douglas–Neumann theorem as applied to a pentagon. The pentagon A_{0} is ABCDE. A_{1} ( = FGHIJ ) is constructed with apex angle 72°, A_{2} ( = KLMNO ) with apex angle 144° and A_{3} ( = PQRST ) with apex angle 216°.

In the case of pentagons, we have n = 5 and n − 2 = 3. So there are three possible values for k, namely 1, 2 and 3, and hence three possible apex angles for isosceles triangles:

(2×1×π)/5 = 2π/5 = 72°
(2×2×π)/5 = 4π/5 = 144°
(2×3×π)/5 = 6π/5 = 216°

According to the PDN-theorem, A_{3} is a regular pentagon. The three-stage process leading to the construction of the regular pentagon A_{3} can be performed in six different ways depending on the order in which the apex angles are selected for the construction of the isosceles triangles.

Serial number	Apex angle in the construction of A_{1}	Apex angle in the construction of A_{2}	Apex angle in the construction of A_{3}
1	72°	144°	216°
2	72°	216°	144°
3	144°	72°	216°
4	144°	216°	72°
5	216°	72°	144°
6	216°	144°	72°

== Proof of the theorem ==
The theorem can be proved using some elementary concepts from linear algebra.

The proof begins by encoding an n-gon by a list of complex numbers representing the vertices of the n-gon. This list can be thought of as a vector in the n-dimensional complex linear space C^{n}. Take an n-gon A and let it be represented by the complex vector

A = ( a_{1}, a_{2}, ... , a_{n} ).

Let the polygon B be formed by the free vertices of similar triangles built on the sides of A and let it be represented by the complex vector

B = ( b_{1}, b_{2}, ... , b_{n} ).

Then we have

α( a_{r} − b_{r} ) = a_{r+1} − b_{r}, where α = exp( i θ ) for some θ (here i is the square root of −1).

This yields the following expression to compute the b_{r} ' s:

b_{r} = (1−α)^{−1} ( a_{r+1} − αa_{r} ).

In terms of the linear operator S : C^{n} → C^{n} that cyclically permutes the coordinates one place, we have

B = (1−α)^{−1}( S − αI )A, where I is the identity matrix.

This means that the polygon A_{j+1} obtained at the jthe step is related to the preceding one A_{j} by

A_{j+1} = ( 1 − ω^{σ_{j}} )^{−1}( S − ω^{σ_{j}} I ) A_{j} ,

where ω = exp( 2πi/n ) is the nth primitive root of unity and σ_{j} is the jth term of a permutation σ of the integer sequence (1,..., n-2).

The last polygon in the sequence, A_{n−2}, which we need to show is regular, is thus obtained from A_{0} by applying the composition of all the following operators:

( 1 − ω^{j} )^{−1}( S − ω^{j} I ) for j = 1, 2, ... , n − 2 .

(These factors commute, since they are all polynomials in the same operator S, so the ordering of the product does not depend on the choice of the permutation σ.)

A polygon P = ( p_{1}, p_{2}, ..., p_{n} ) is a regular n-gon if each side of P is obtained from the next by rotating through an angle of 2π/n, that is, if

p_{r + 1} − p_{r} = ω( p_{r + 2} − p_{r + 1} ).

This condition can be formulated in terms of S as follows:

( S − I )( I − ωS ) P = 0.

Or equivalently as

( S − I )( S − ω^{n − 1} I ) P = 0, since ω^{n} = 1.

The main result of the Petr–Douglas–Neumann theorem now follows from the following computations.

( S − I )( S − ω^{n − 1} I ) A_{n − 2}

= ( S − I )( S − ω^{n − 1} I ) ( 1 − ω )^{−1} ( S − ω I ) ( 1 − ω^{2} )^{−1} ( S − ω^{2} I ) ... ( 1 − ω^{n − 2} )^{−1} ( S − ω^{n − 2} I ) A_{0}
= ( 1 − ω )^{−1}( 1 − ω^{2} )^{−1} ... ( 1 − ω^{n − 2} )^{−1} ( S − I ) ( S − ω I ) ( S − ω^{2} I ) ... ( S − ω^{n − 1} I)A_{0}
= ( 1 − ω )^{−1}( 1 − ω^{2} )^{−1} ... ( 1 − ω^{n − 2} )^{−1} ( S^{n} − I ) A_{0}
= 0, since S^{n} = I.

To show that all the centroids are equal, we note that the centroid c_{A} of any n-gon is obtained by averagining all the vertices. This means that, viewing A as an n-component vector, its centroid is given by taking its scalar product

c_{A}= (E , A)

with the vector E:=(1/n) (1, 1, ..., 1) . Taking the scalar product of both sides of the equation

A_{j+1} = ( 1 − ω^{σ_{j}} )^{−1}( S − ω^{σ_{j}} I ) A_{j} ,

with E, and noting that E is invariant under the cyclic permutation operator S, we obtain

c_{A_{j+1}} = (E, A_{j+1}) = ( 1 − ω^{σ_{j}} )^{−1} ( 1 − ω^{σ_{j}} )(E, A_{j}) = (E, A_{j}) = c_{A_{j}} ,

so all the centroids are equal.
