= Alois Anderka =

Czech politician

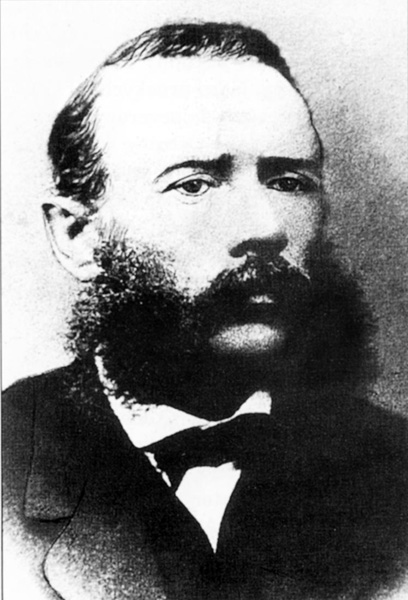
Alois Anderka

Alois Anderka (25 June 1825 – 7 April 1886) was the second mayor of Ostrava, holding office from 1864 to 1873.

== Life and career ==
Anderka was born in Nové Lublice, Austrian Silesia on 25 June 1825. He first entered politics in 1858. In 1861 he was elected onto the local committee and in 1864 was elected mayor of Ostrava.

He cooperated with the occupying Prussian forces during the Austrian-Prussian War. He managed to minimise the damage caused by the soldiers. After a peace was concluded, he was decorated by the Emperor.

In 1868 he received a permit to create a main school in Moravská Ostrava. In 1869 he organised for a railroad to be placed between Ostrava and Frýdlant. Also during his tenure, a public gaslight was established in 1870 and a new city graveyard was opened in 1871.

His investing activities caused a deficit of 170,000 gold pieces, resulting in Anderka not being named mayor in 1873. He remained in communal politics, serving on the local committee.

Anderka was succeeded as mayor by Konstantin Grünwald. He died of lung disease in Moravská Ostrava on 7 April 1886.

Political offices
Preceded by Hermann Zwierzina	Mayor of Ostrava; 1864–1873	Succeeded by Konstantin Grünwald
