= 4318 Baťa =

Main-belt asteroid

Discovery
- Discovered by: Z. Vávrová
- Discovery site: Kleť Obs.
- Discovery date: 21 February 1980

Designations
- Named after: Tomáš Baťa (Czech businessman)
- Alternative designations: 1980 DE_{1} · 1977 TB_{3} 1986 GJ
- Minor planet category: main-belt · (outer) background

Orbital characteristics
- Epoch 27 April 2019 (JD 2458600.5)
- Uncertainty parameter 0
- Observation arc: 61.48 yr (22,457 d)
- Aphelion: 3.5580 AU
- Perihelion: 2.8881 AU
- Semi-major axis: 3.2231 AU
- Eccentricity: 0.1039
- Orbital period (sidereal): 5.79 yr (2,113 d)
- Mean anomaly: 313.92°
- Mean motion: 0° 10^{m} 13.08^{s} / day
- Inclination: 9.5410°
- Longitude of ascending node: 33.144°
- Argument of perihelion: 96.856°

Physical characteristics
- Mean diameter: 25.79±4.95 km 27.47±8.03 km 28.26±1.20 km
- Synodic rotation period: 10.571±0.2523 h
- Geometric albedo: 0.05; 0.051; 0.055
- Spectral type: D (SDSS-MOC)
- Absolute magnitude (H): 11.60; 11.70; 11.8; 11.98

4318 Baťa, provisional designation 1980 DE_{1}, is a dark background asteroid from the outermost regions of the asteroid belt, approximately 27 kilometers (17 miles) in diameter. It was discovered on 21 February 1980, by astronomer Zdeňka Vávrová at the Kleť Observatory in the Czech Republic. The D-type asteroid has a rotation period of 10.6 hours and is likely elongated in shape. It was named in memory of Czech businessman Tomáš Baťa.

== Orbit and classification ==
Baťa is a non-family asteroid from the main belt's background population. It orbits the Sun in the outermost asteroid belt at a distance of 2.9–3.6 AU once every 5 years and 9 months (2,113 days; semi-major axis of 3.22 AU). Its orbit has an eccentricity of 0.10 and an inclination of 10° with respect to the ecliptic. The body's observation arc begins with a precovery taken at Palomar Observatory in April 1957, almost 23 years prior to its official discovery observation at the Kleť Observatory.

== Naming ==
This minor planet was named in memory of Tomáš Baťa (1876–1932), a world-renowned Czech businessman and founder of the Bata Shoe Organization. The official naming citation was published by the Minor Planet Center on 8 June 1990 (M.P.C. 16444).

== Physical characteristics ==
In the SDSS-based taxonomy, Baťa is a very dark D-type asteroid. This spectral type is typical in the outermost asteroid belt and often found in the Jupiter trojan population.

=== Rotation period ===
In April 2004, a rotational lightcurve of Baťa was obtained from photometric observations by astronomers at the Palomar Transient Factory in California. Lightcurve analysis gave a rotation period of 10.571±0.2523 hours with a high brightness amplitude of 0.62 magnitude, indicative of an elongated, non-spherical shape (U=2).

=== Diameter and albedo ===
According to the surveys carried out by the Japanese Akari satellite and the NEOWISE mission of NASA's Wide-field Infrared Survey Explorer, Baťa measures between 25.79 and 28.26 kilometers in diameter and its surface has an albedo between 0.05 and 0.055. The Collaborative Asteroid Lightcurve Link assumes a standard albedo for a carbonaceous asteroid of 0.057 and calculates a diameter of 21.09 kilometers based on an absolute magnitude of 12.11.
