= Karel Petr =

Czech mathematician

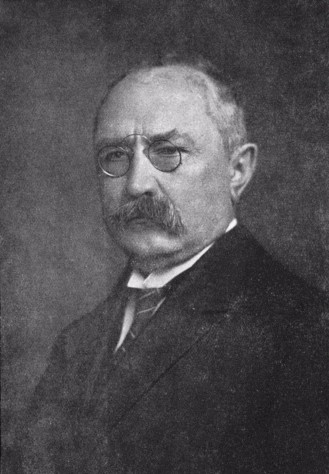
Petr in 1928

Karel Petr (Czech pronunciation: [ˈkarɛl ˈpɛtr̩]; 14 June 1868 – 14 February 1950) was a Czech mathematician.

== Biography ==
Petr was born on 14 June 1868 in Zbyslav Bohemia, Austria-Hungary (today part of Vrdy, Czech Republic). He is known for the Petr–Douglas–Neumann theorem in plane geometry, which he proved in 1905 (in Czech) and in 1908 (in German). It was independently rediscovered by Jesse Douglas in 1940 and by Bernhard Neumann in 1941.

Eduard Čech was a doctoral student of Petr at Charles University in Prague. Petr's doctoral students also included Bohumil Bydžovský and Václav Hlavatý.

Petr died on 14 February 1950 in Prague.
