= Victor Thébault =

French mathematician

Victor Michael Jean-Marie Thébault (1882–1960) was a French mathematician best known for propounding three problems in geometry. The name Thébault's theorem is used by some authors to refer to the first of these problems and by others to refer to the third.

Thébault was born on March 6, 1882, in Ambrières-les-Grand (today a part of Ambrières-les-Vallées, Mayenne) in the northwest of France. He got his education at a teacher's college in Laval, where he studied from 1898 to 1901. After his graduation he taught for three years at Pré-en-Pail until he got a professorship at technical school in Ernée. In 1909 he placed first in a competitive exams, which yielded him a certificate to work as a science professor at teachers' colleges. Thébault however found a professor's salary insufficient to support his large family and hence he left teaching to become a factory superintendent at Ernée from 1910 to 1923. In 1924 he became a chief insurance inspector in Le Mans, a position he held until his retirement in 1940. During his retirement he lived in Tennie. He died on March 19, 1960, shortly after a severe stroke and was survived by his wife, five sons and a daughter.

Despite leaving teaching Thébault stayed active in mathematics with number theory and geometry being his main areas of interest. He published a large number of articles in math journals all over the world and aside from regular articles he also contributed many original problems and solutions to their problem sections. He published over 1000 original problems in various mathematical magazines and his contributions to the problem section of the American Mathematical Monthly alone comprise over 600 problems and solutions. In recognition of his contributions the French government bestowed two titles on him. In 1932 he became an Officier de L'Instruction Publique and in a 1935 a Chevalier de l'Order de Couronne de Belgium.
