= Žleby =

- Municipality
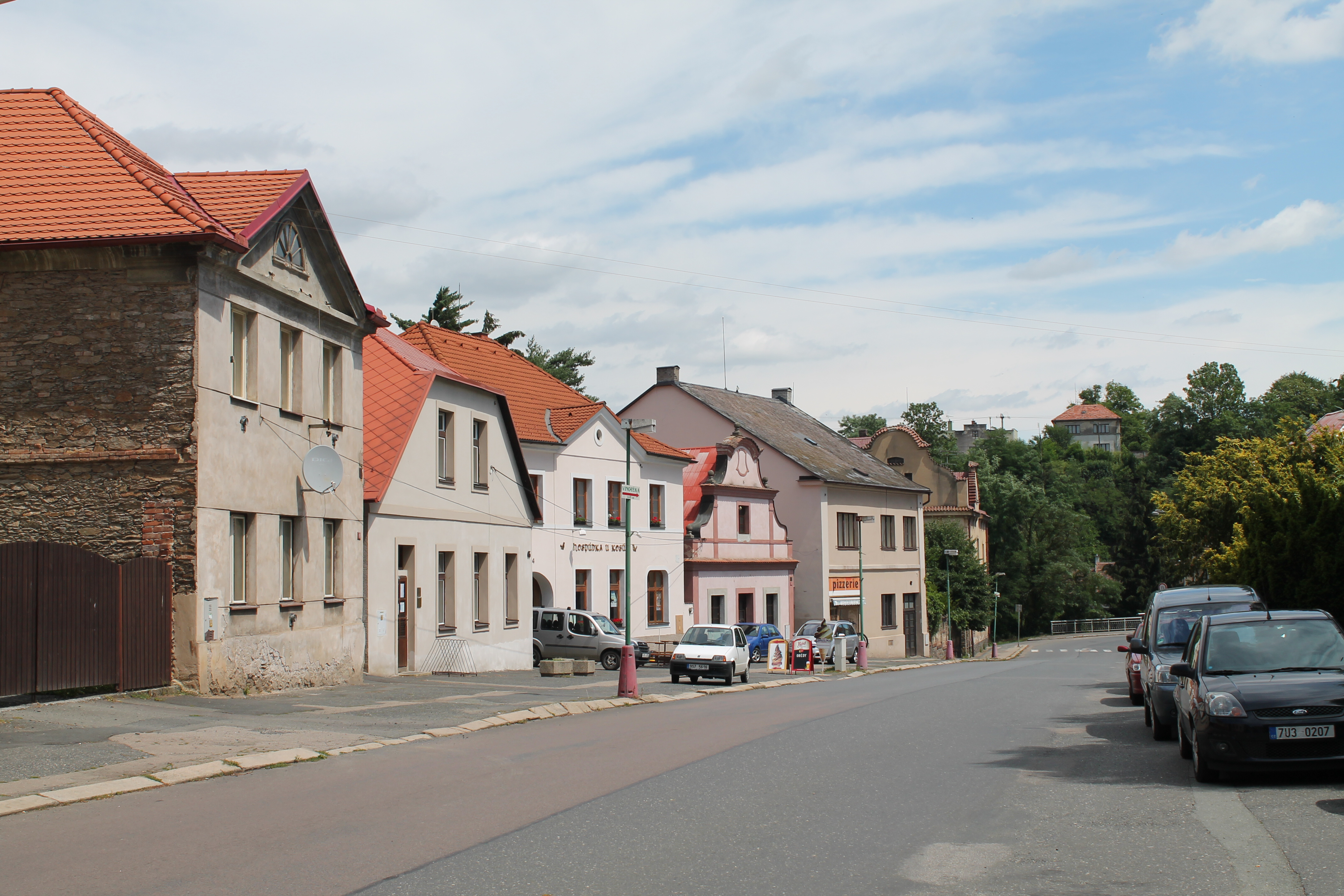
- Centre of Žleby

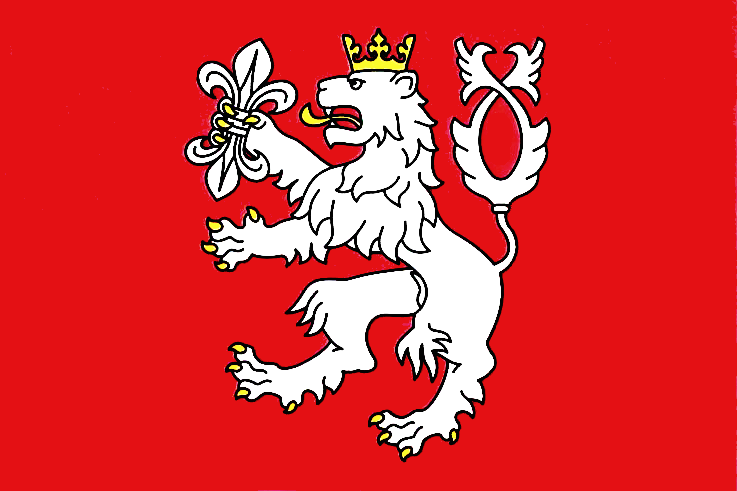
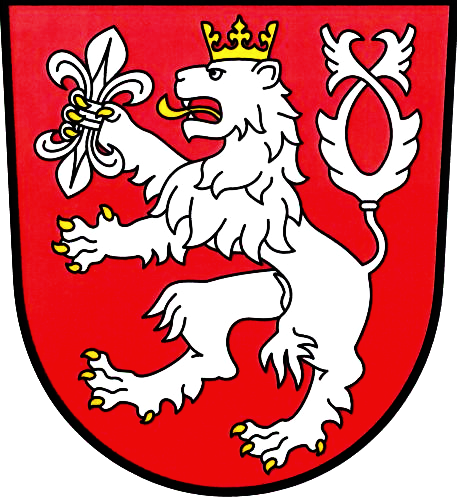
- Flag Coat of arms

- Location in the Czech Republic
- Coordinates: 49°53′25″N 15°28′55″E
- Country: Czech Republic
- Region: Central Bohemian
- District: Kutná Hora
- First mentioned: 1278

Area
  - Total: 14.64 km^{2} (5.65 sq mi)
- Elevation: 243 m (797 ft)

Population (2026-01-01)
  - Total: 1,423
  - Density: 97.20/km^{2} (251.7/sq mi)
- Time zone: UTC+1 (CET)
  - Summer (DST): UTC+2 (CEST)
- Postal codes: 285 61, 286 01
- Website: www.ouzleby.cz

Žleby is a municipality and village in Kutná Hora District in the Central Bohemian Region of the Czech Republic. It has about 1,400 inhabitants. It is known for the Žleby Castle, which is protected as a national cultural monument.

== Administrative division ==
Žleby consists of four municipal parts (in brackets population according to the 2021 census):

- Žleby (1,153)
- Kamenné Mosty (68)
- Markovice (51)
- Zehuby (69)

== Etymology ==
The name Žleby is derived from the Czech word žlab, i.e. 'trough'.

== Geography ==
Žleby is located about 17 kilometres (11 mi) southeast of Kutná Hora and 25 km (16 mi) southwest of Pardubice. It lies in a flat agricultural landscape in the Central Elbe Table. The highest point is at 285 m (935 ft) above sea level. The Doubrava River flows through the municipality.

== History ==
The first written mention of Žleby is from 1278. In the Middle Ages, it used to be a market town. It was promoted to a market town in 1356, when it was owned by King Charles IV.

== Demographics ==
Historical population

Year	Pop.	±%
1869	2,324	—
1880	2,761	+18.8%
1890	2,773	+0.4%
1900	2,762	−0.4%
1910	2,803	+1.5%

Year	Pop.	±%
1921	2,641	−5.8%
1930	2,308	−12.6%
1950	1,759	−23.8%
1961	1,798	+2.2%
1970	1,629	−9.4%

Year	Pop.	±%
1980	1,512	−7.2%
1991	1,339	−11.4%
2001	1,270	−5.2%
2011	1,233	−2.9%
2021	1,341	+8.8%

Source: Censuses

== Transport ==
Žleby is located on the railway line of local importance Čáslav–Třemošnice.

== Sights ==
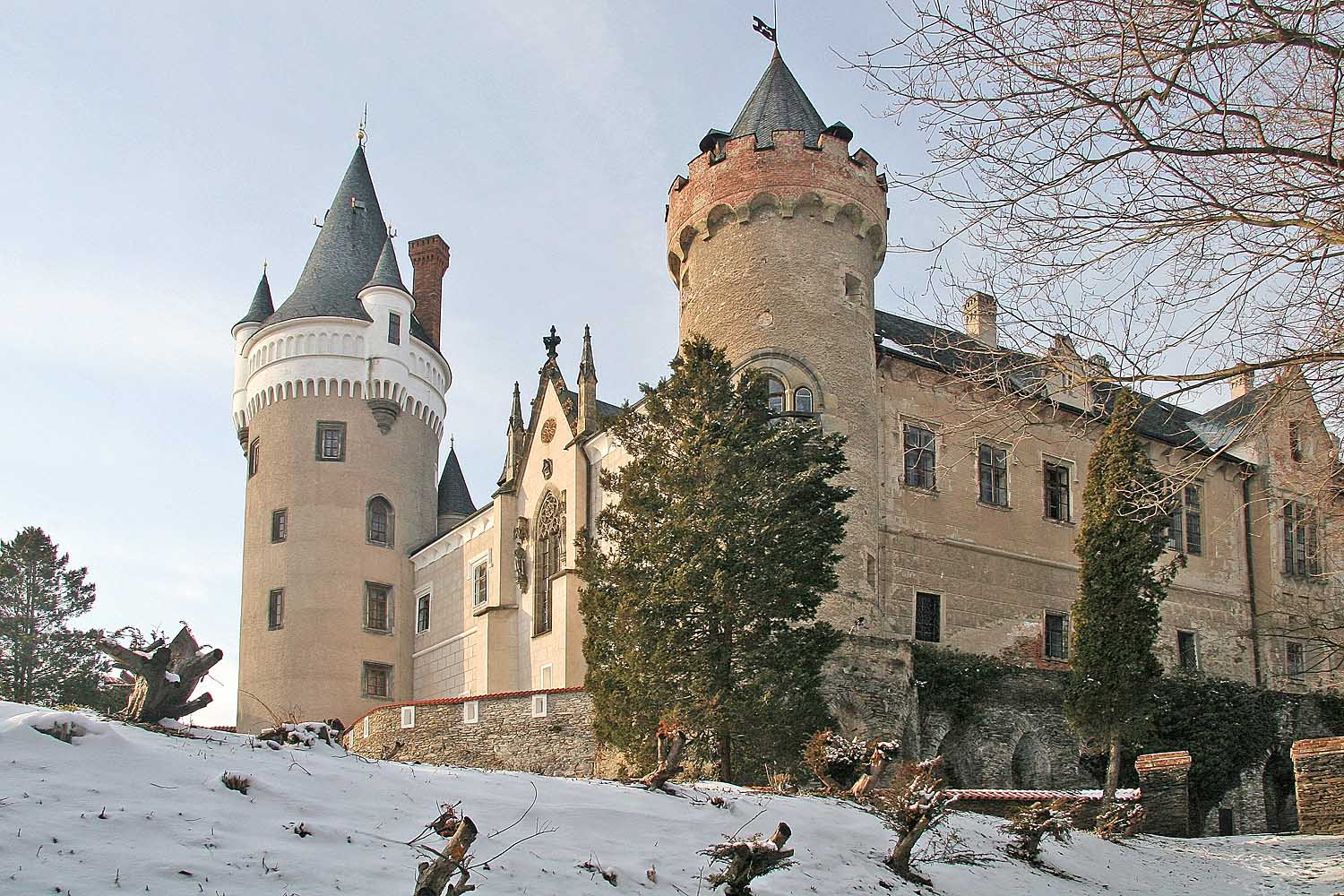
Žleby Castle

Žleby is known for the Žleby Castle. Its existence was first mentioned in 1289. It was originally a Gothic castle, later modified in the late Renaissance and late Baroque styles. In 1849–1868, it was rebuilt into its current neo-Gothic romantic form. The castle includes an English landscape garden with an area of 24 ha (59 acres), which was established during the last reconstruction of the castle. For its artistic and historical value, Žleby Castle is protected as a national cultural monument.

The castle's deer park is known as one of two preserves that cherish white stag, and has plenty of other wild animals, especially the hunting birds. It was founded in 1973 and with an area of 130 ha (320 acres) it is one of the largest deer parks in the country.

The Church of the Nativity of the Virgin Mary is originally a Renaissance building, rebuilt in the Baroque style in the second half of the 18th century.
