= Třemošnice =

- Town
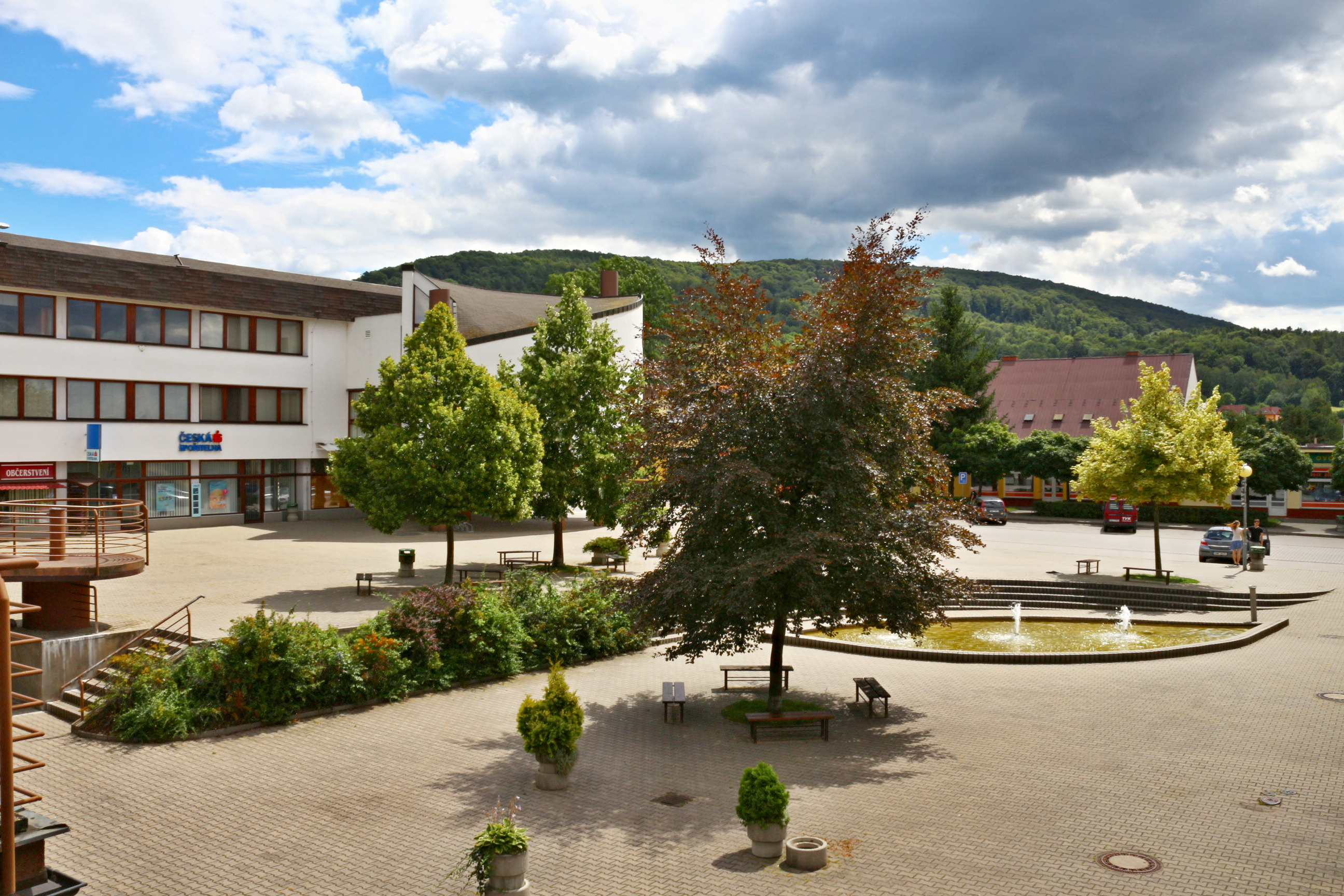
- The square Náměstí Míru

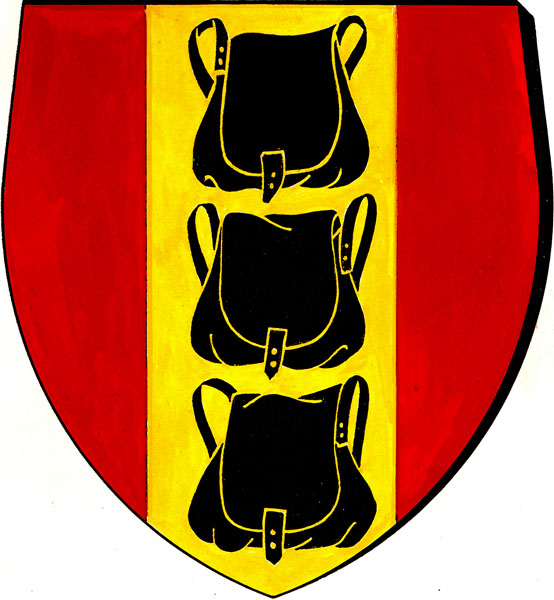
- Flag Coat of arms

- Location in the Czech Republic
- Coordinates: 49°52′9″N 15°34′48″E
- Country: Czech Republic
- Region: Pardubice
- District: Chrudim
- First mentioned: 1564

Government
  - Mayor: Miroslav Bubeník

Area
  - Total: 19.01 km^{2} (7.34 sq mi)
- Elevation: 301 m (988 ft)

Population (2026-01-01)
  - Total: 3,380
  - Density: 178/km^{2} (461/sq mi)
- Time zone: UTC+1 (CET)
  - Summer (DST): UTC+2 (CEST)
- Postal code: 538 43
- Website: www.tremosnice.cz

Třemošnice (Czech pronunciation: [ˈtr̝̊ɛmoʃɲɪtsɛ]) is a town in Chrudim District in the Pardubice Region of the Czech Republic. It has about 3,400 inhabitants.

== Administrative division ==
Třemošnice consists of eight municipal parts (in brackets population according to the 2021 census):

- Třemošnice (2,491)
- Hedvikov (0)
- Kubíkovy Duby (15)
- Lhůty (16)
- Podhradí (66)
- Skoranov (99)
- Starý Dvůr (100)
- Závratec (117)

== Etymology ==
The name Třemošnice evolved from the Czech word střemcha, i.e. 'bird cherry'.

== Geography ==
Třemošnice is located about 17 kilometres (11 mi) southwest of Chrudim and 22 km (14 mi) southwest of Pardubice. It lies on the border between the Iron Mountains and Central Elbe Table. The highest point is the mountain Bučina at 606 m (1,988 ft) above sea level. The stream Zlatý potok flows through the town and supplies a system of two fishponds east of the town. There is also a fishpond right in the centre of Třemošnice, which is supplied by a nameless tributary of the Zlatý potok.

== History ==
The first written mention of Třemošnice is from 1564. A fortress was built here in 1610, which was rebuilt into a small castle in 1750. In 1816, an ironworks was established, which led to an increase in the population. In 1882, the railway was built.

== Demographics ==
Historical population

Year	Pop.	±%
1869	1,582	—
1880	1,716	+8.5%
1890	1,739	+1.3%
1900	1,689	−2.9%
1910	1,697	+0.5%

Year	Pop.	±%
1921	1,693	−0.2%
1930	1,754	+3.6%
1950	1,652	−5.8%
1961	1,902	+15.1%
1970	2,025	+6.5%

Year	Pop.	±%
1980	2,747	+35.7%
1991	3,366	+22.5%
2001	3,404	+1.1%
2011	3,080	−9.5%
2021	2,904	−5.7%

Source: Censuses

== Transport ==
Třemošnice is the starting point of the railway line to Čáslav.

== Sights ==
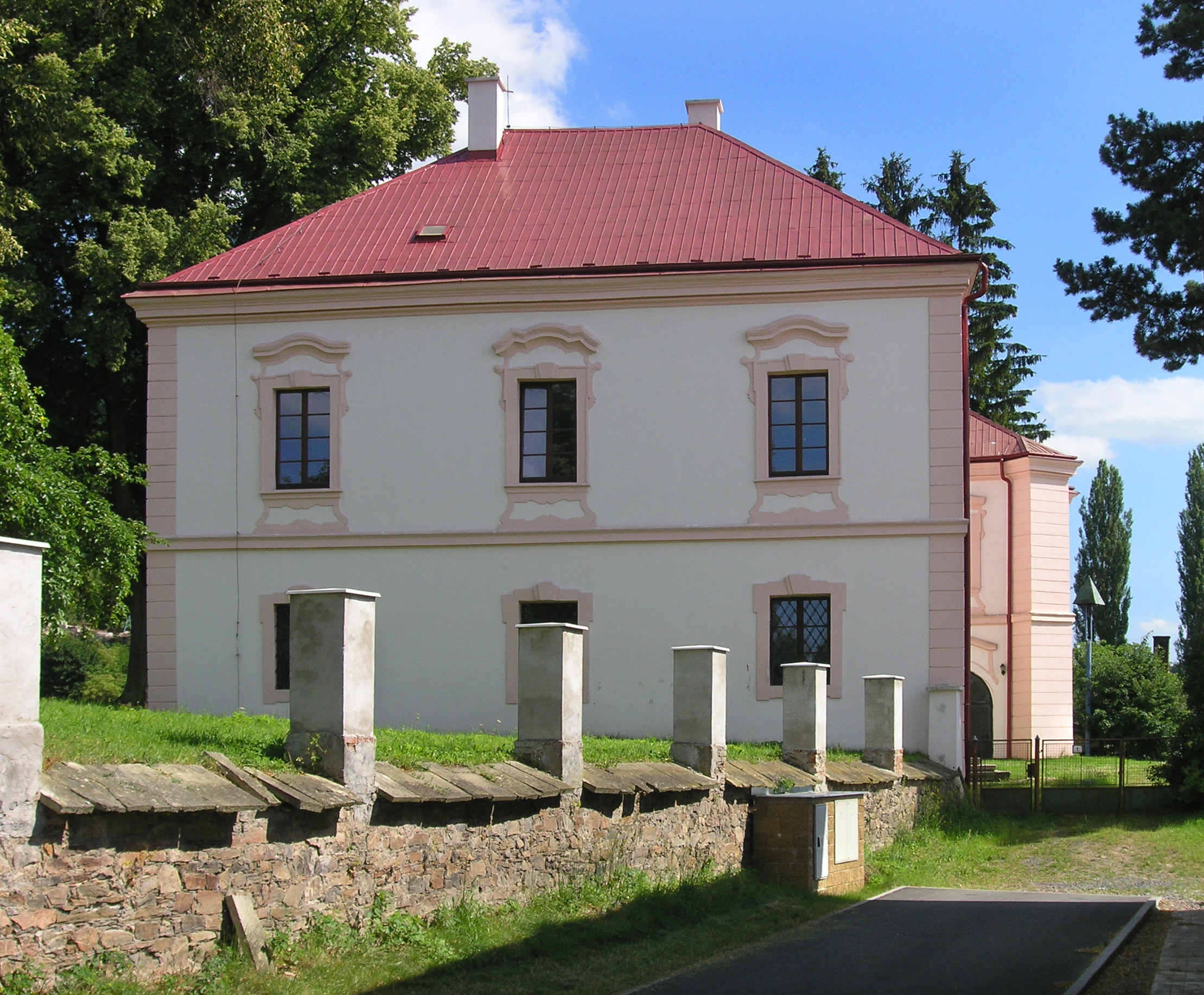
Třemošnice Castle

The late Baroque Třemošnice Castle is privately owned and its interiors were converted into apartments.

A technical and cultural monument is the Berlova lime factory. It was built around 1880. The area is valuable for its authenticity and the degree of preservation of the entire technological system of furnaces, including the unique charging device. There are plans to turn the unused building into an information centre and industrial museum.

In Podhradí on the hill Světlice is a ruin of the Lichnice Castle. This early Gothic castle was founded in the first half of the 13th century and was conquered during the Hussite Wars in 1428. In 1490, it was completely rebuilt by the Trčka of Lípa family. The 1610 fire damaged the castle and it was only provisionally repaired during the Thirty Years' War. From the beginning of the 18th century, the castle fell into disrepair and was dismantled as a source of building material.

== Notable people ==
- Hermann Zwierzina (1825–1873), the first mayor of Ostrava

== Gallery ==
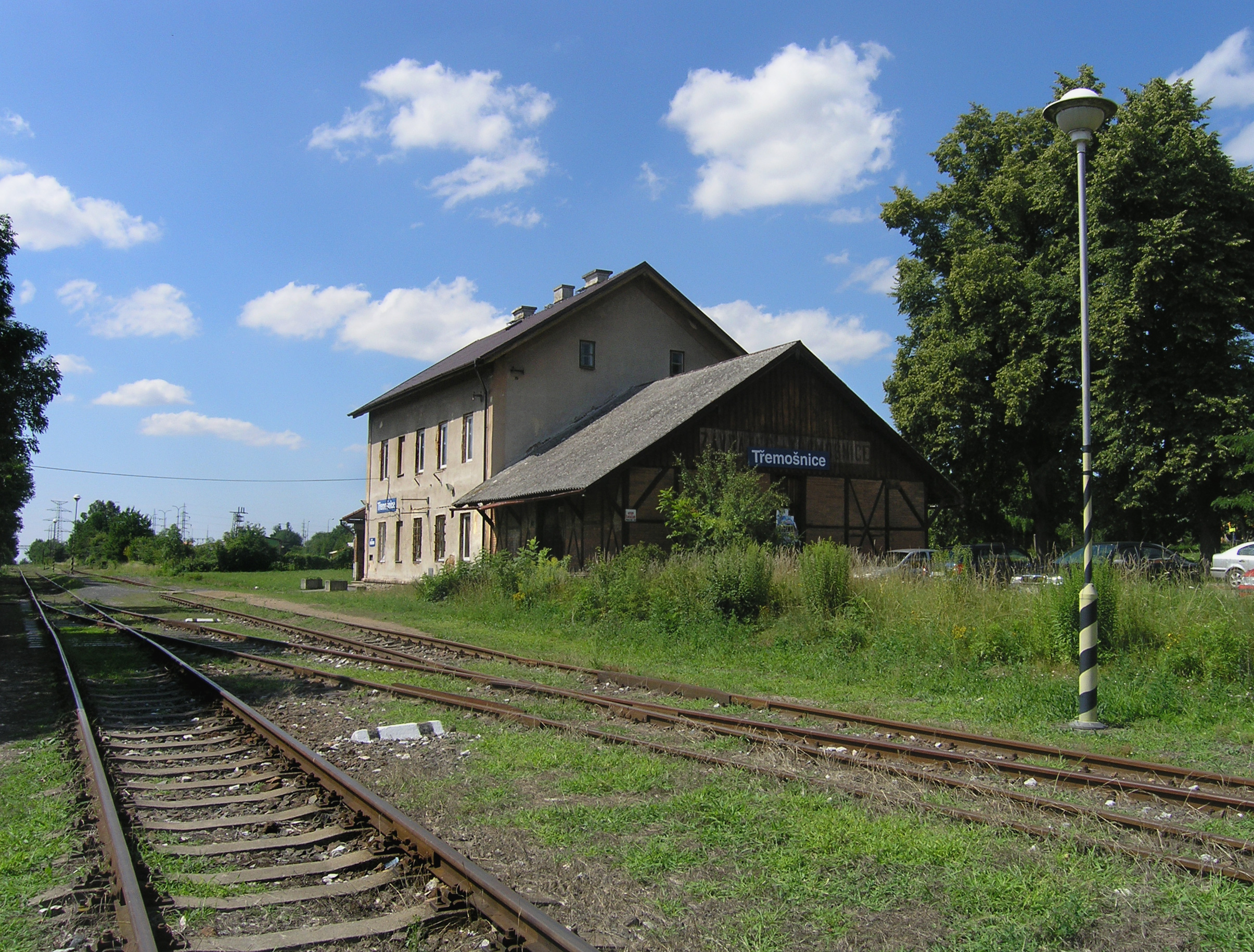
Train station

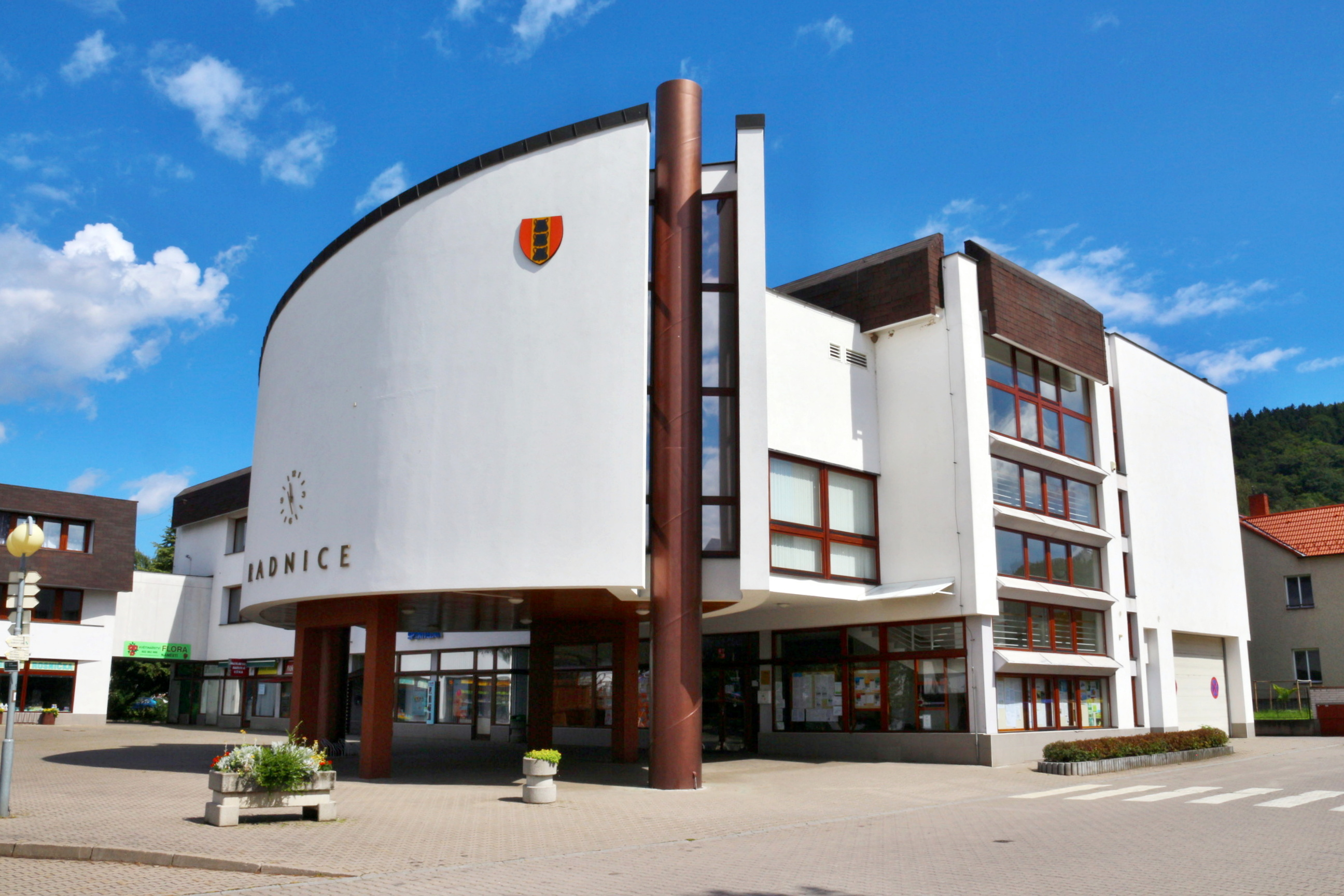
Town hall

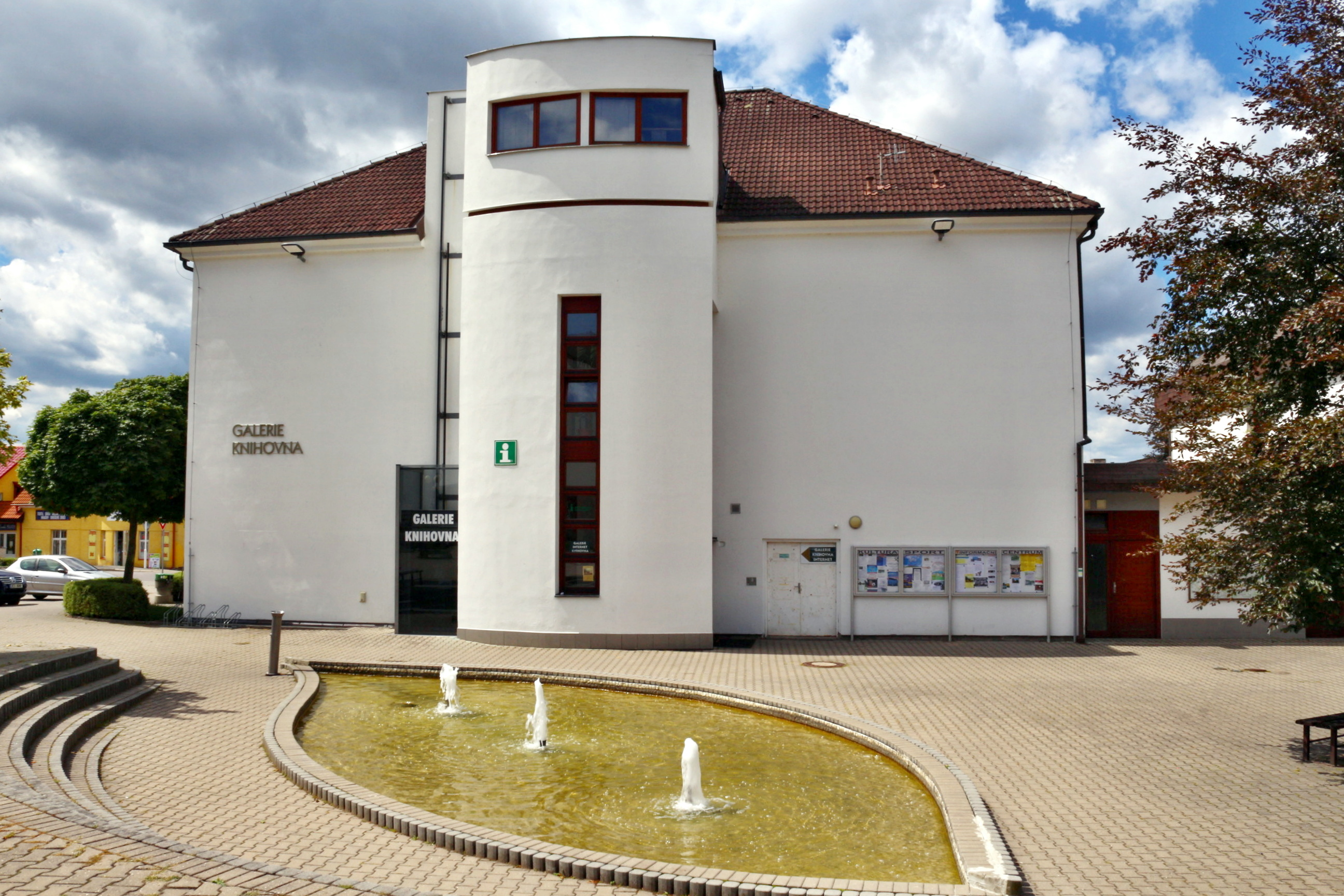
Art gallery and library
