= Bohumil Bydžovský =

Czech mathematician (1880–1969)

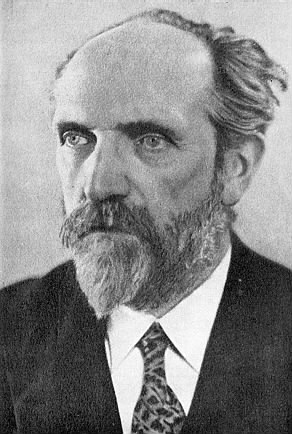
Bohumil Bydžovský in the 1920s

Bohumil Bydžovský (14 March 1880 – 6 May 1969) was a Czech mathematician, specializing in algebraic geometry and algebra.

== Education and career ==
Bydžovský was born in Duchcov on 14 March 1880. In 1898, he graduated at the Academic Gymnasium in Prague and then studied mathematics (in particular, geometry taught by Eduard Weyr) and physics at the Charles University in Prague. There Bydžovský received his Ph.D. (promotion) in 1903 with thesis supervised by Karel Petr. Bydzovksy became a teacher at secondary schools, including the real school in |Prague-Karlín from 1907 to 1910 (with the title of Professor). In 1909 he received his habilitation in mathematics, then lectured at the Polytechnic in Prague, and then in 1911 received his habilitation in engineering. He became in 1917 professor extraordinarius and in 1920 professor ordinarius at the Charles University in Prague. He was in 1930–1931 dean of the Faculty of Sciences and in 1946 rector of the Charles University in Prague. In 1949 he became the chair of the Czechoslovak National Research Council.

He died in Jindřichův Hradec on 6 May 1969, aged 89.

== Contributions ==
Bydžovský wrote undergraduate textbooks in analytic geometry, linear algebra, and algebraic geometry. He did research on infinite groups, the theory of matrices and determinants, and geometric configurations. He also published papers on the history of geometry and mathematics education.

== Recognition ==
He became in 1919, a corresponding member and in 1929 a full member of the Czech Academy of Sciences and Arts and in 1952, a full member of the Czechoslovak Academy of Sciences. He was an Invited Speaker of the ICM in 1920 in Strasbourg, in 1924 in Toronto, in 1928 in Bologna, and in 1936 in Oslo.

== Personal ==
He married and was the father of two sons.
