= Napoleon's theorem =

Theorem on an equilateral triangle constructed from three equilateral triangles

Napoleon's theorem: If the triangles centered on are equilateral, then so is the green triangle.

In geometry, Napoleon's theorem states that if equilateral triangles are constructed on the sides of any triangle, either all outward or all inward, the lines connecting the centres of those equilateral triangles themselves form an equilateral triangle.

The triangle thus formed is called the inner or outer Napoleon triangle. The difference in the areas of the outer and inner Napoleon triangles equals the area of the original triangle.

The theorem is often attributed to Napoleon Bonaparte (1769–1821). According to Howard Eves, the theorem and a construction problem bearing Napoleon's name were discovered by his friend and adviser Lorenzo Mascheroni (1750–1800), who let the Emperor claim them for himself. Some have suggested that it may date back to W. Rutherford's 1825 question published in The Ladies' Diary, four years after the French emperor's death, but the result is covered in three questions set in an examination for a gold medal at the University of Dublin in October, 1820, whereas Napoleon died the following May.

== Proofs ==
In the figure above, △ABC is the original triangle. △AZB, △BXC, △CYA are equilateral triangles constructed on its sides' exteriors, and points L, M, N are the centroids of those triangles. The theorem for outer triangles states that triangle △LMN (green) is equilateral.

A quick way to see that △LMN is equilateral is to observe that M̅N̅ becomes C̅Z̅ under a clockwise rotation of 30° around A and a homothety of ratio $\sqrt 3$ with the same center, and that L̅N̅ also becomes C̅Z̅ after a counterclockwise rotation of 30° around B and a homothety of ratio $\sqrt 3$ with the same center. The respective spiral similarities are $A(\sqrt 3, -30^\circ),\ B(\sqrt 3, 30^\circ).$ That implies M̅N̅ = L̅N̅ and the angle between them must be 60°.

There are in fact many proofs of the theorem's statement, including a synthetic (coordinate-free) one, a trigonometric one, a symmetry-based approach, and proofs using complex numbers.

== Background ==
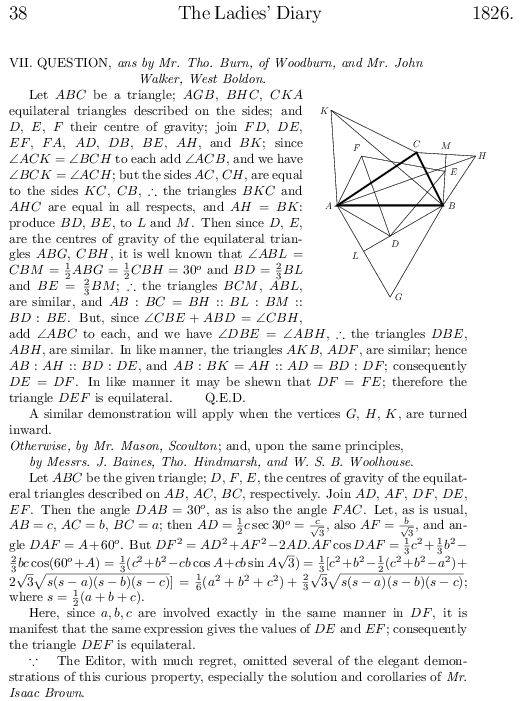
Extract from the 1826 Ladies' Diary giving geometric and analytic proofs

The theorem has frequently been attributed to Napoleon, but several papers have been written concerning this issue which cast doubt upon this assertion (see (Grünbaum 2012)).

The following entry appeared on page 47 in the Ladies' Diary of 1825 (so in late 1824, a year or so after the compilation of Dublin examination papers). This is an early appearance of Napoleon's theorem in print, and Napoleon's name is not mentioned.

VII. Quest.(1439); by Mr. W. Rutherford, Woodburn.

"Describe equilateral triangles (the vertices being either all outward or all inward) upon the three sides of any triangle △ABC: then the lines which join the centres of gravity of those three equilateral triangles will constitute an equilateral triangle. Required a demonstration."

Since William Rutherford was a very capable mathematician, his motive for requesting a proof of a theorem that he could certainly have proved himself is unknown. Maybe he posed the question as a challenge to his peers, or perhaps he hoped that the responses would yield a more elegant solution. However, it is clear from reading successive issues of the Ladies' Diary in the 1820s, that the Editor aimed to include a varied set of questions each year, with some suited for the exercise of beginners.

Plainly there is no reference to Napoleon in either the question or the published responses, which appeared a year later in 1826, though the Editor evidently omitted some submissions. Also, Rutherford himself does not appear amongst the named solvers after the printed solutions, although from the tally a few pages earlier it is evident that he did send in a solution, as did several of his pupils and associates at Woodburn School, including the first of the published solutions. Indeed, the Woodburn Problem Solving Group, as it might be known today, was sufficiently well known by then to be written up in A Historical, Geographical, and Descriptive View of the County of Northumberland ... (2nd ed. Vo. II, pp. 123–124). It had been thought that the first known reference to this result as Napoleon's theorem appears in Faifofer's 17th Edition of Elementi di Geometria published in 1911, although Faifofer does actually mention Napoleon in somewhat earlier editions. But this is moot because we find Napoleon mentioned by name in this context in an encyclopaedia by 1867. What is of greater historical interest as regards Faifofer is the problem he had been using in earlier editions: a classic problem on circumscribing the greatest equilateral triangle about a given triangle that Thomas Moss had posed in the Ladies Diary in 1754, in the solution to which by William Bevil the following year we might easily recognize the germ of Napoleon's Theorem - the two results then run together, back and forth for at least the next hundred years in the problem pages of the popular almanacs: when Honsberger proposed in Mathematical Gems in 1973 what he thought was a novelty of his own, he was actually recapitulating part of this vast, if informal, literature.

It might be as well to recall that a popular variant of the Pythagorean proposition, where squares are placed on the edges of triangles, was to place equilateral triangles on the edges of triangles: could you do with equilateral triangles what you could do with squares - for example, in the case of right triangles, dissect the one on the hypotenuse into those on the legs? Just as authors returned repeatedly to consider other properties of Euclid's Windmill or Bride's Chair, so the equivalent figure with equilateral triangles replacing squares invited - and received - attention. Perhaps the most significant effort in this regard is William Mason's Prize Question in the Lady's and Gentleman's Diary for 1864, the solutions and commentary for which the following year run to some fifteen pages. By then, this particular venue - starting in 1704 for the Ladies' Diary and in 1741 for the Gentleman's Diary - was on its last legs, but problems of this sort continued in the Educational Times right into the early 1900s.

=== Dublin Problems, October, 1820 ===
In the Geometry paper, set on the second morning of the papers for candidates for the gold medal in the General Examination of the University of Dublin in October 1820, the following three problems appear.

Question 10. Three equilateral triangles are thus constructed on the sides of a given triangle, A, B, D, the lines joining their centres, C, C', C" form an equilateral triangle. [The accompanying diagram shows the equilateral triangles placed outwardly.]

Question 11. If the three equilateral triangles are constructed as in the last figure, the lines joining their centres will also form an equilateral triangle. [The accompanying diagram shows the equilateral triangles places inwardly.]

Question 12. To investigate the relation between the area of the given triangle and the areas of these two equilateral triangles.

These problems are recorded in

- Dublin problems: a collection of questions proposed to the candidates for the gold medal at the general examinations, from 1816 to 1822 inclusive. Which is succeeded by an account of the fellowship examination, in 1823 (G. and W. B. Whittaker, London, 1823)

Question 1249 in the Gentleman's Diary; or Mathematical Repository for 1829 (so appearing in late 1828) takes up the theme, with solutions appearing in the issue for the following year. One of the solvers, T. S. Davies then generalized the result in Question 1265 that year, presenting his own solution the following year, drawing on a paper he had already contributed to the Philosophical Magazine in 1826. There are no cross-references in this material to that described above. However, there are several items of cognate interest in the problem pages of the popular almanacs both going back to at least the mid-1750s (Moss) and continuing on to the mid-1860s (Mason), as alluded to above.

As it happens, Napoleon's name is mentioned in connection with this result in no less a work of reference than Chambers's Encyclopaedia as early as 1867 (Vol. IX, towards the close of the entry on triangles).

Another remarkable property of triangles, known as Napoleon's problem is as follows: if on any triangle three equilateral triangles are described, and the centres of gravity of these three be joined, the triangle thus formed is equilateral, and has its centre of gravity coincident with that of the original triangle.

But then the result had appeared, with proof, in a textbook by at least 1834 (James Thomson's Euclid, pp. 255–256). In an endnote (p. 372), Thomason adds

This curious proposition I have not met with, except in the Dublin Problems, published in 1823, where it is inserted without demonstration.

In the second edition (1837), Thomson extended the endnote by providing proof from a former student in Belfast:

The following is an outline of a very easy and neat proof it by Mr. Adam D. Glasgow of Belfast, a former student of mine of great taste and talent for mathematical pursuits:

Thus, Thomson does not appear aware of the appearance of the problem in the Ladies' Diary for 1825 or the Gentleman's Diary for 1829 (just as J. S. Mackay was to remain unaware of the latter appearance, with its citation of Dublin Problems, while noting the former; readers of the American Mathematical Monthly have a pointer to Question 1249 in the Gentleman's Diary from R. C. Archibald in the issue for January 1920, p. 41, fn. 7, although the first published solution in the Ladies Diary for 1826 shows that even Archibald was not omniscient in matters of priority).

== Common center ==
The centers of both the inner and outer Napoleon triangles coincide with the centroid of the original triangle. This coincidence was noted in Chambers's Encyclopaedia in 1867, as quoted above. The entry there is unsigned. P. G. Tait, then Professor of Natural Philosophy in the University of Edinburgh, is listed amongst the contributors, but J. U. Hillhouse, Mathematical Tutor also at the University of Edinburgh, appears amongst other literary gentlemen connected for longer or shorter times with the regular staff of the Encyclopaedia. However, in Section 189(e) of An Elementary Treatise on Quaternions, also in 1867, Tait treats the problem (in effect, echoing Davies' remarks in the Gentleman's Diary in 1831 with regard to Question 1265, but now in the setting of quaternions):

If perpendiculars be erected outwards at the middle points of the sides of a triangle, each being proportional to the corresponding side, the mean point of their extremities coincides with that of the original triangle. Find the ratio of each perpendicular to half the corresponding side of the old triangle that the new triangle may be equilateral.

Tait concludes that the mean points of equilateral triangles erected outwardly on the sides of any triangle form an equilateral triangle. The discussion is retained in subsequent editions in 1873 and 1890, as well as in his further Introduction to Quaternions jointly with Philip Kelland in 1873.

== Areas and sides of inner and outer Napoleon triangles ==
The area of the inner Napoleon triangle of a triangle with area △ is

$$\text {Area(inner)} = -\frac{\triangle}{2} + \frac{\sqrt{3}}{24}(a^2+b^2+c^2)\ge 0,$$

where a, b, c are the side lengths of the original triangle, with equality only in the case in which the original triangle is equilateral, by Weitzenböck's inequality. However, from an algebraic standpoint the inner triangle is "retrograde" and its algebraic area is the negative of this expression.

The area of the outer Napoleon triangle is

$$\text {Area(outer)} = \frac{\triangle}{2} + \frac{\sqrt{3}}{24}(a^2+b^2+c^2).$$

Analytically, it can be shown that each of the three sides of the outer Napoleon triangle has a length of
$$\text{Side(outer)} = \sqrt{{a^2+b^2+c^2 \over 6} + {\sqrt{(a+b+c)(a+b-c)(a-b+c)(-a+b+c)} \over {2\sqrt{3}}}}= \sqrt{{a^2+b^2+c^2 \over 6} + {2\triangle \over \sqrt{3}}}.$$

The relation between the latter two equations is that the area of an equilateral triangle equals the square of the side times $\sqrt{3} / 4.$

== Generalizations ==
Equilateral triangles on the sides of an arbitrary hexagon: When A_{1} = A_{4}, A_{2} = A_{5}, and A_{3} = A_{6}, this theorem becomes the Napoleon theorem

=== Petr–Douglas–Neumann theorem ===
If isosceles triangles with apex angles $\tfrac{2k\pi}{n}$ are erected on the sides of an arbitrary n-gon A_{0}, and if this process is repeated with the n-gon formed by the free apices of the triangles, but with a different value of k, and so on until all values 1 ≤ k ≤ n − 2 have been used (in arbitrary order), then a regular n-gon A_{n−2} is formed whose centroid coincides with the centroid of A_{0}.

=== Napoleon-Barlotti theorem ===
Napoleon-Barlotti theorem for a pentagon

The centers of regular n-gons constructed over the sides of an n-gon P form a regular n-gon if and only if P is an affine image of a regular n-gon.

=== Jha-Savarn generalization ===
Given a hexagon A_{1}A_{2}A_{3}A_{4}A_{5}A_{6} with equilateral triangles constructed on the sides, either inwardly or outwardly, and the apexes of the equilateral triangles labelled B_{i}. If G_{1}, G_{3}, G_{5} are the respective centroids of △B_{6}B_{1}B_{2}, △B_{2}B_{3}B_{4}, △B_{4}B_{5}B_{6}, then G_{1}, G_{3}, G_{5} form an equilateral triangle.

=== Dao Than Oai generalization ===
Given a hexagon ABCDEF with equilateral ∆'s ABG, DHC, IEF constructed on the alternate sides AB, CD and EF, either inwardly or outwardly. Let A_{1}, B_{1}, C_{1} be the centroids of ∆FGC, ∆BHE, and ∆DIA respectively, let A_{2}, B_{2}, C_{2} be the centroids of ∆DGE, ∆AHF, and ∆BIC respectively. Then ∆A_{1}B_{1}C_{1} and ∆A_{2}B_{2}C_{2} are equilateral triangles. (If, for example, we let points A and F coincide, as well as B and C, and D and E, then Dao Than Oai's result reduces to Napoleon's theorem).

== See also ==
- Napoleon points
- Lemoine's problem
- Napoleon's problem
- Van Aubel's theorem
