= Doubrava (river) =

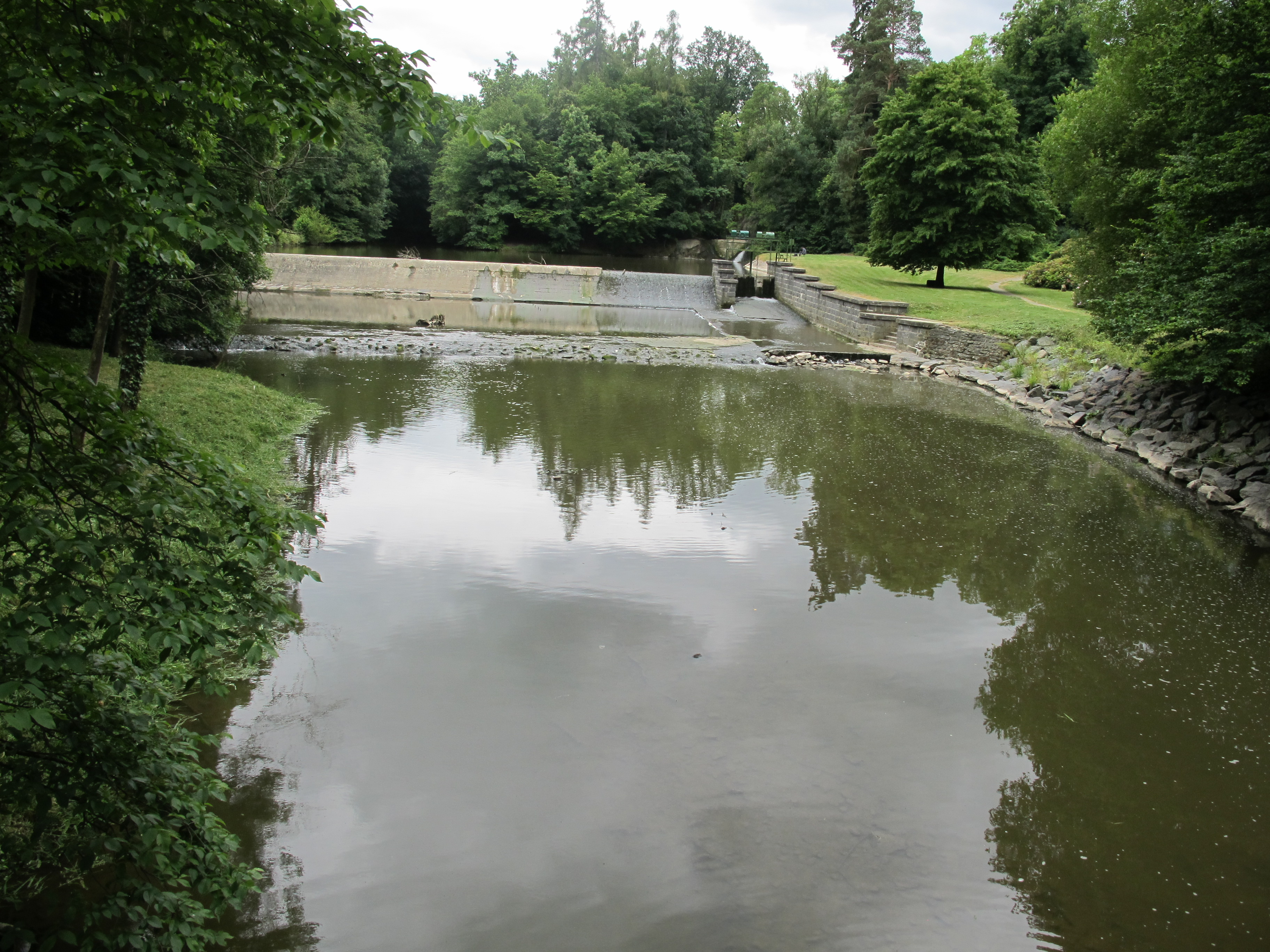
- The Doubrava in Žleby

Location
- Country: Czech Republic
- Regions: Vysočina; Pardubice; Central Bohemian

Physical characteristics
- Source
  - location: Radostín, Křižanov Highlands
  - coordinates: 49°38′10″N 15°52′15″E
  - elevation: 624 m (2,047 ft)
- Mouth
  - location: Elbe
  - coordinates: 50°1′40″N 15°20′15″E
  - elevation: 196 m (643 ft)
- Length: 88.3 km (54.9 mi)
- Basin size: 591.4 km^{2} (228.3 sq mi)
- Discharge
  - average: 3.75 m^{3}/s (132 cu ft/s) near estuary

Basin features
- Progression: Elbe→ North Sea

The Doubrava (Czech pronunciation: [ˈdoubrava]) is a river in the Czech Republic, a left tributary of the Elbe River. It flows through the Vysočina, Pardubice and Central Bohemian regions. It is 88.3 km (54.9 mi) long.

== Etymology ==
The Czech word doubrava means 'oak forest' (derived from dub = 'oak'). However, the name did not express the character of the entire stream (that the river would flow through oak forests), but this type of name was most often created according to the groups of trees that grew at its mouth.

== Characteristic ==
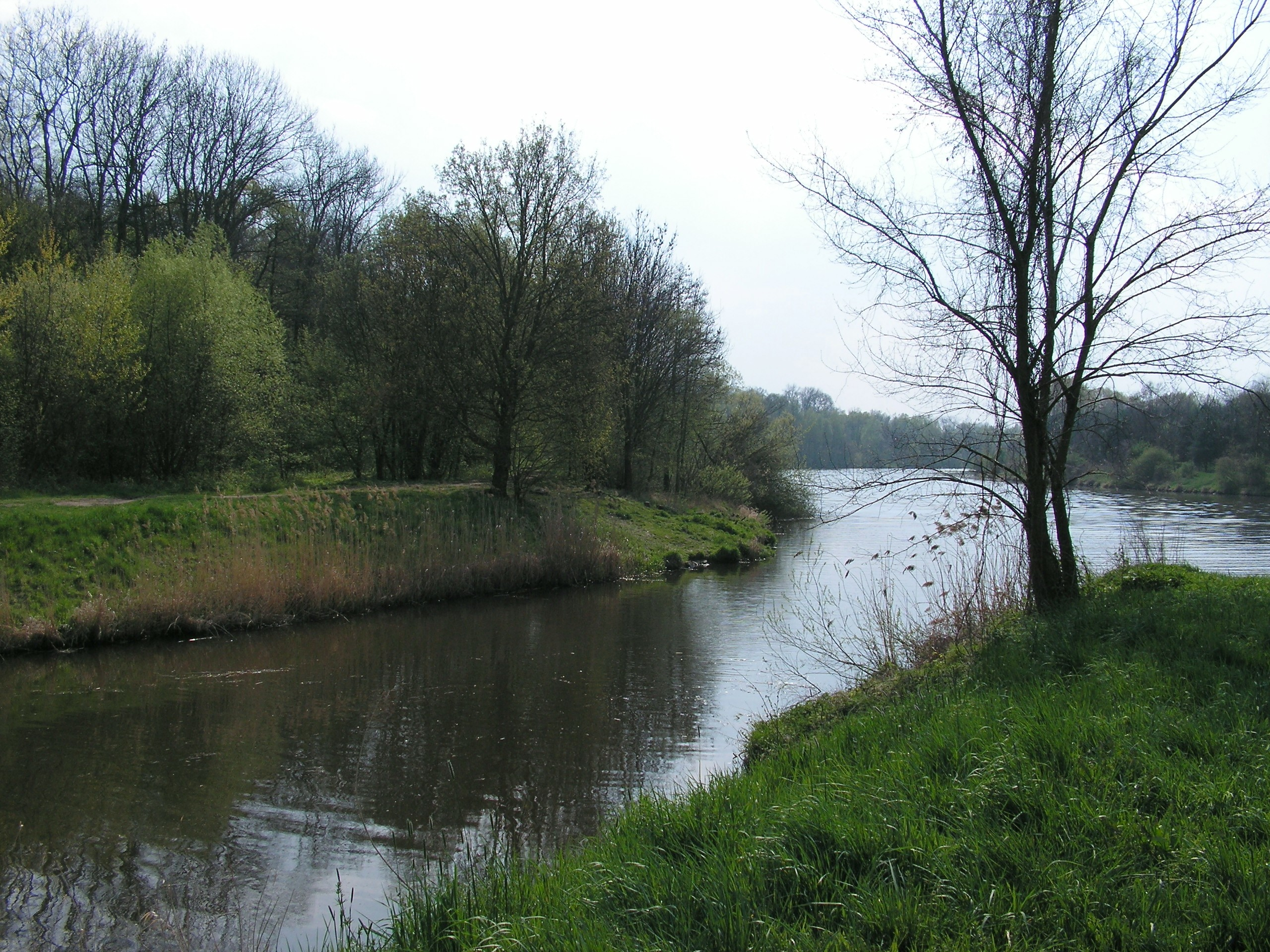
Confluence of the Doubrava (left) and Elbe

The Doubrava originates in the territory of Radostín on the border between the Křižanov Highlands and Upper Sázava Hills, at an elevation of 624 m (2,047 ft). The river has three marked springs, lying close to each other. Due to human activity (draining marshes and regulating water courses), the yield of the springs has changed over time, and it is not clear which spring is the main one.

The Doubrava flows to Záboří nad Labem, where it enters the Elbe River at an elevation of 196 m (643 ft). It is 88.3 km (54.9 mi) long. Its drainage basin has an area of 591.4 km^{2} (228.3 sq mi).

The longest tributaries of the Doubrava are:

Tributary	Length (km)	River km	Side
Brslenka	31.4	8.3	left
Hostačovka	23.7	25.2	left
Čertovka	14.6	4.9	right
Starkočský potok	12.8	12.8	right
Zlatý potok	10.0	34.3	right

== Course ==
The most populated settlement at the river is the town of Chotěboř. The river flows through the municipal territories of Radostín, Krucemburk, Ždírec nad Doubravou, Sobíňov, Chotěboř, Dolní Sokolovec, Libice nad Doubravou, Bezděkov, Maleč, Nová Ves u Chotěboře, Víska, Čečkovice, Jeřišno, Borek, Běstvina, Kraborovice, Heřmanice, Ronov nad Doubravou, Žleby, Vrdy, Vinaře, Vlačice, Bílé Podolí, Žehušice, Horka I, Rohozec, Svatý Mikuláš, Kobylnice and Záboří nad Labem.

== Bodies of water ==
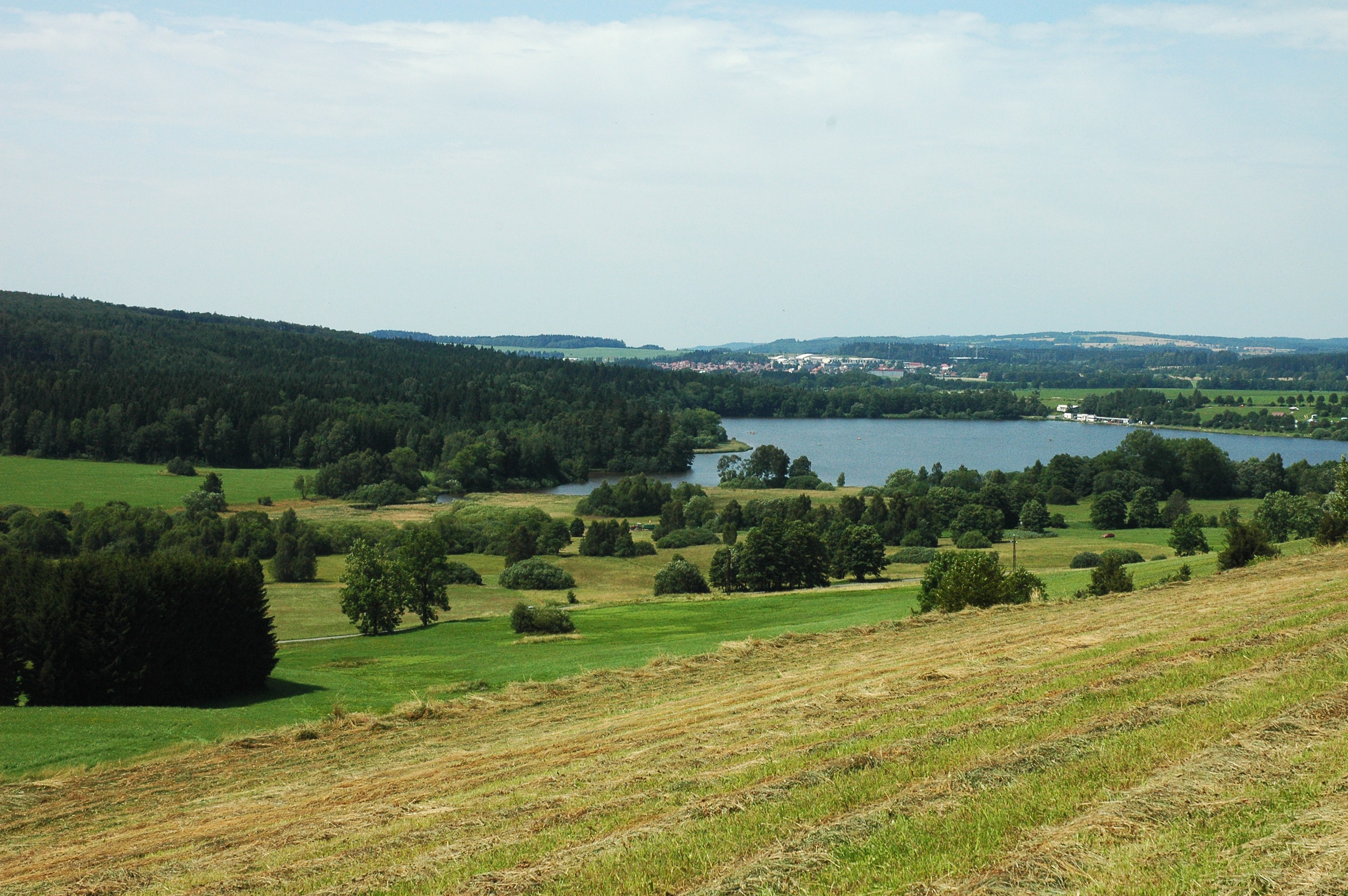
Řeka fishpond

There are 673 bodies of water in the basin area. The largest of them is the fishpond Řeka with an area of 43.0 ha (106 acres), built directly on the Doubrava. On the middle course of the river is built the Pařížov Reservoir with an area of 7.4 ha (18 acres).

== Protection of nature ==
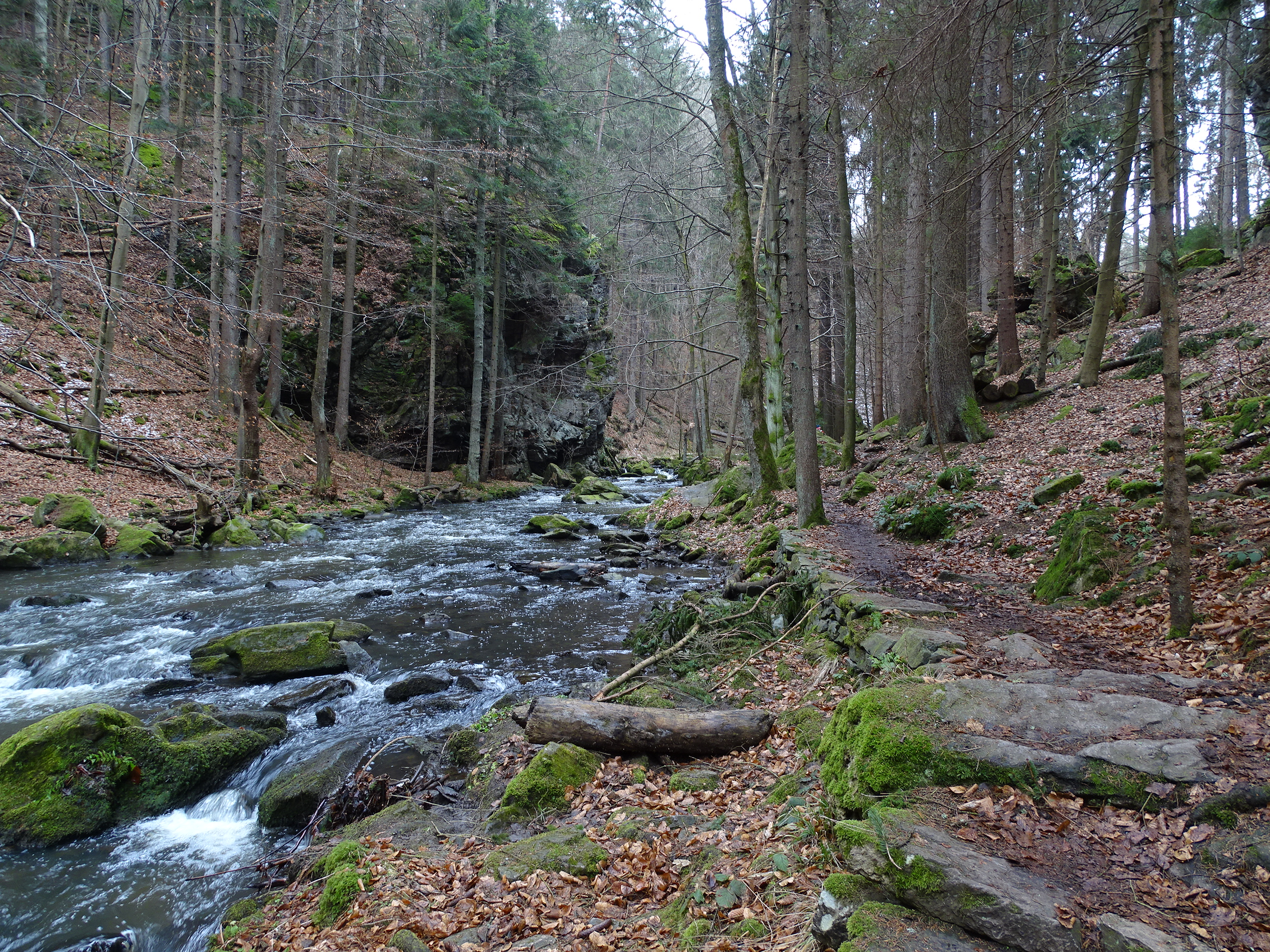
Údolí Doubravy Nature Reserve

The Doubrava originates in the Žďárské vrchy Protected Landscape Area and leaves the protected area after about 12 km (7.5 mi). Řeka pond is located within the protected area. The mouth of the river to the pond is specially protected as the Řeka Nature Reserve with an area of 16.1 ha (40 acres). The subject of protection are wet peat meadows with abundant occurrence of protected and endangered species of plants and animals.

Near Chotěboř, the river crosses the Železné hory Protected Landscape Area (but not the eponymous mountain range that forms the main part of the protected area). The valley of the Doubrava inside this protected area is specially protected as the Údolí Doubravy Nature Reserve with an area of 93.2 ha (230 acres). The river created there a canyon-like valley with many geomorphologically significant shapes. The valley is also valuable for occurrence of protected and rare species of plants and animals.

== Tourism ==
The Doubrava is suitable for river tourism only after heavy rains, melting snow or when water is released from the Pařížov Reservoir. Two sections of the river are navigable, but they are recommended only to experienced paddlers.

== See also ==
- List of rivers of the Czech Republic
