= Heřmanice =

Heřmanice or Hermanice may refer to:

== Czech Republic ==
- Heřmanice (Havlíčkův Brod District), a municipality and village in the Vysočina Region
- Heřmanice (Liberec District), a municipality and village in the Liberec Region
- Heřmanice (Náchod District), a municipality and village in the Hradec Králové Region
- Heřmanice, a village and part of Králíky in the Pardubice Region
- Heřmanice, a village and part of Nová Paka in the Hradec Králové Region
- Heřmanice (Ostrava), a part of Ostrava in the Moravian-Silesian Region
- Heřmanice, a village and part of Starý Jičín in the Moravian-Silesian Region
- Heřmanice, a village and part of Žandov in the Liberec Region
- Heřmanice u Oder, a municipality and village in the Moravian-Silesian Region
- Heřmanice v Podještědí, a village and part of Jablonné v Podještědí in the Liberec Region
- České Heřmanice, a municipality and village in the Pardubice Region
- Dolní Heřmanice, a municipality and village in the Vysočina Region
- Svobodné Heřmanice, a municipality and village in the Moravian-Silesian Region

== Poland ==
- Hermanice, Ustroń, Silesian Voivodeship
