= Libice nad Doubravou =

- Market town
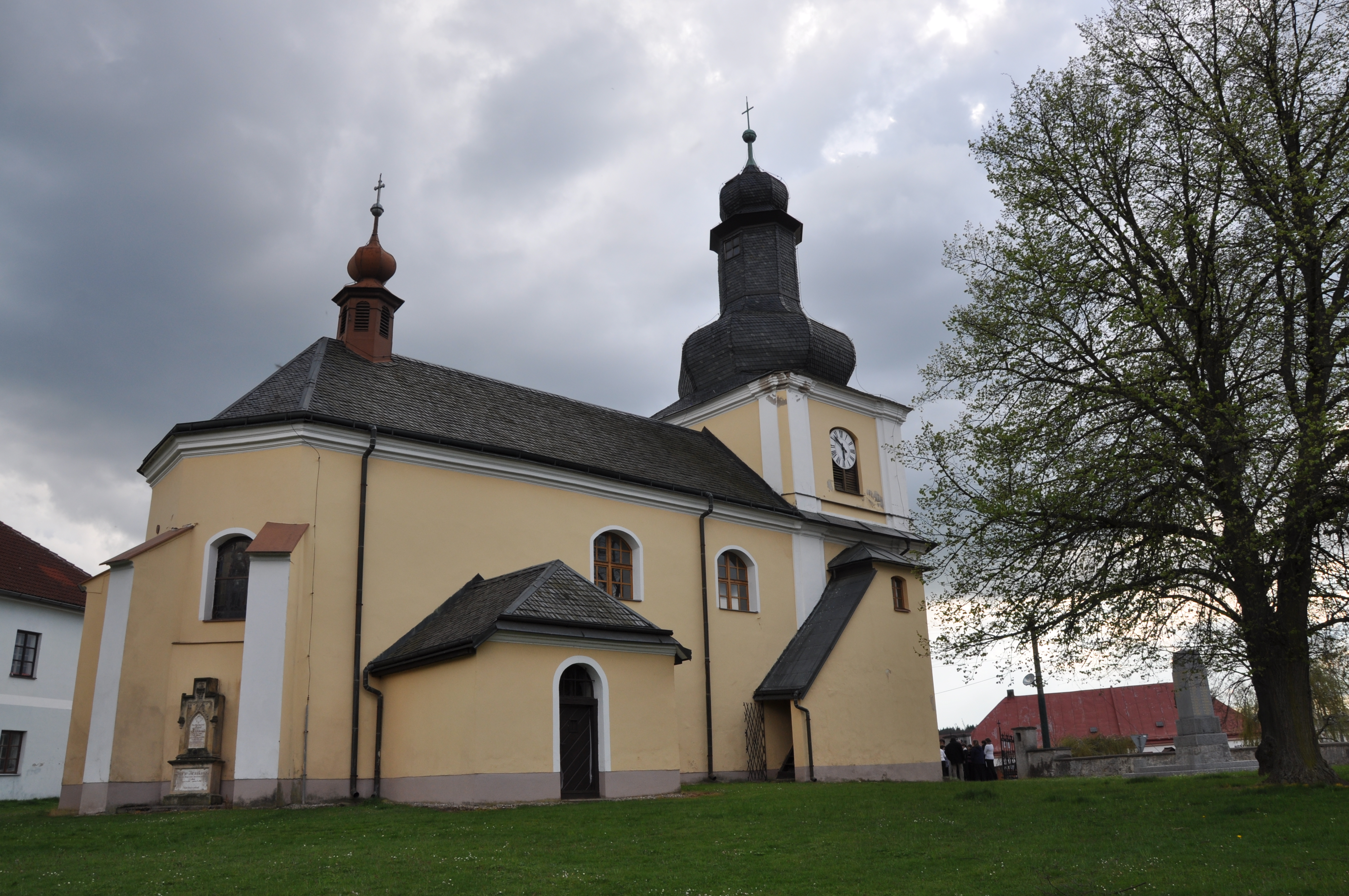
- Church of Saint Giles

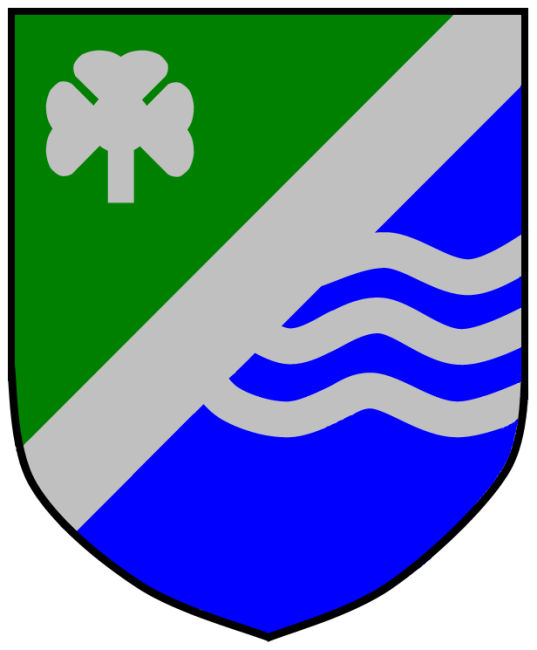
- Flag Coat of arms

- Location in the Czech Republic
- Coordinates: 49°44′42″N 15°42′15″E
- Country: Czech Republic
- Region: Vysočina
- District: Havlíčkův Brod
- First mentioned: 1146

Area
  - Total: 21.96 km^{2} (8.48 sq mi)
- Elevation: 421 m (1,381 ft)

Population (2026-01-01)
  - Total: 858
  - Density: 39.1/km^{2} (101/sq mi)
- Time zone: UTC+1 (CET)
  - Summer (DST): UTC+2 (CEST)
- Postal codes: 582 77, 583 01
- Website: www.libicend.cz

Libice nad Doubravou (Czech pronunciation: [ˈlɪbɪtsɛ ˈnad doubravou]; German: Libitz) is a market town in Havlíčkův Brod District in the Vysočina Region of the Czech Republic. It has about 900 inhabitants.

== Administrative division ==
Libice nad Doubravou consists of ten municipal parts (in brackets population according to the 2021 census):

- Libice nad Doubravou (571)
- Barovice (43)
- Chloumek (33)
- Kladruby (19)
- Křemenice (18)
- Lhůta (40)
- Libická Lhotka (76)
- Malochyně (7)
- Nehodovka (4)
- Spálava (12)

Malochyně forms an exclave of the municipal territory.

== Etymology ==
The oldest form of the name Libice was Ľubiac. The name was derived from the personal name Ľubiata, meaning "Ľubiata's (court)". In the 14th century, the name evolved to Libiec and in the 15th century to Libíc. From the second half of the 16th century, the form Libice appeared. The suffix nad Doubravou means 'upon the Doubrava'.

== Geography ==
Libice nad Doubravou is located about 17 kilometres (11 mi) northeast of Havlíčkův Brod and 32 km (20 mi) south of Pardubice. The southern part of the municipal territory with the market town proper lies in the Upper Sázava Hills. The northern part lies in the Iron Mountains. The highest point is the hill Spálava at 663 m (2,175 ft) above sea level. The market town is situated on the right bank of the Doubrava River. The entire municipal territory lies within the Železné hory Protected Landscape Area.

== History ==
The first written mention of Libice nad Doubravou is in a deed of Vladislaus II from 1146, which confirmed the donation of the village by Duke Soběslav I to the bishopric of Olomouc in 1125.

== Demographics ==
Historical population

Year	Pop.	±%
1869	1,904	—
1880	1,939	+1.8%
1890	1,788	−7.8%
1900	1,752	−2.0%
1910	1,765	+0.7%

Year	Pop.	±%
1921	1,762	−0.2%
1930	1,519	−13.8%
1950	1,137	−25.1%
1961	1,110	−2.4%
1970	999	−10.0%

Year	Pop.	±%
1980	890	−10.9%
1991	845	−5.1%
2001	850	+0.6%
2011	814	−4.2%
2021	823	+1.1%

Source: Censuses

== Transport ==
There are no railways or major roads passing through the municipality.

== Sights ==
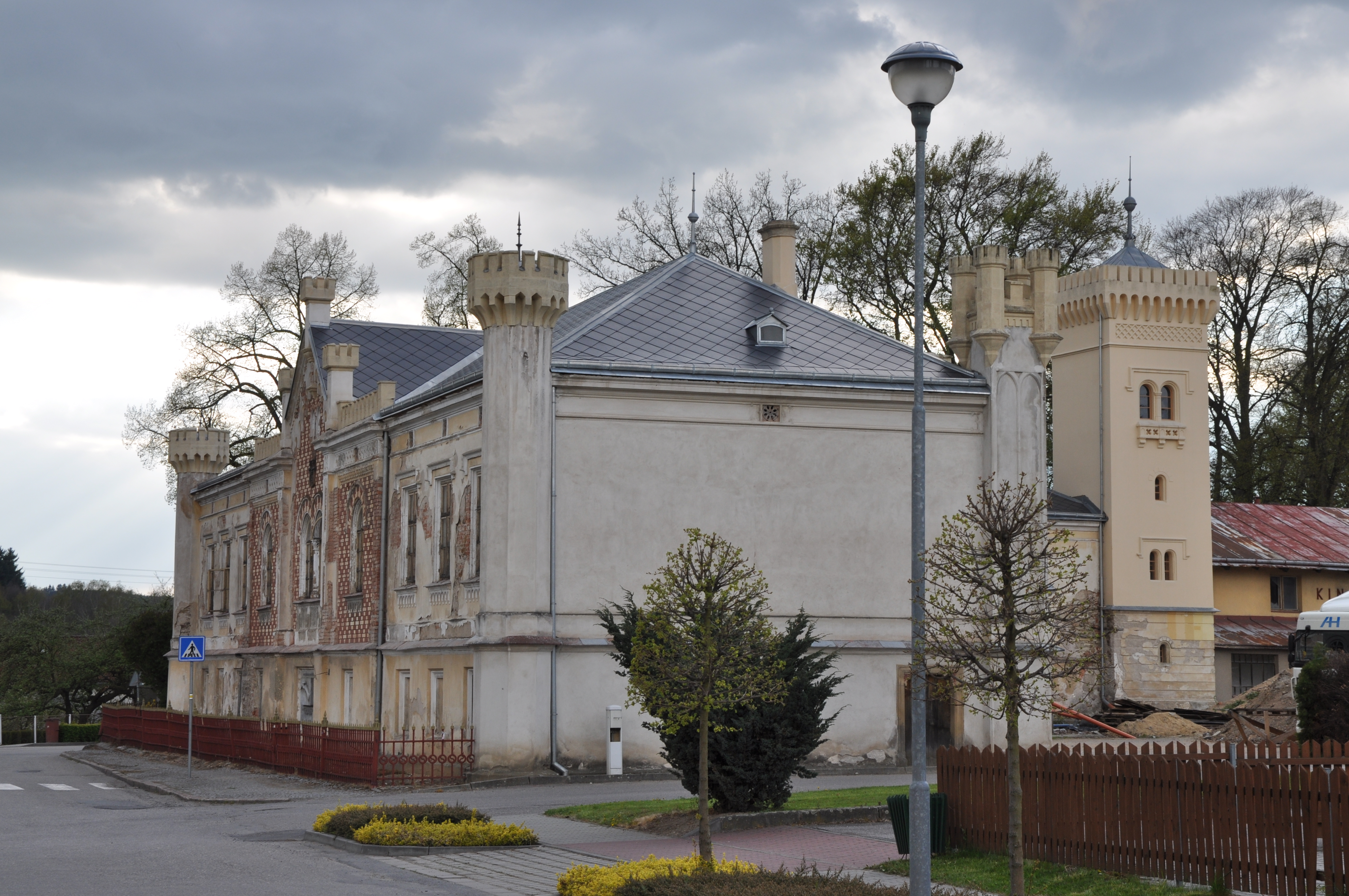
Libice nad Doubravou Castle

The castle in Libice nad Doubravou was built sometime between 1709 and 1719. In 1862–1864, it was rebuilt in the Windsor neo-Gothic style. Today it is privately owned and unused.

Among the main landmarks is the Church of Saint Giles. It is a Baroque building with a Romanesque-Gothic core.

== Notable people ==
- Jan Lála (1938–2025), footballer
