= Vinaře =

- Municipality
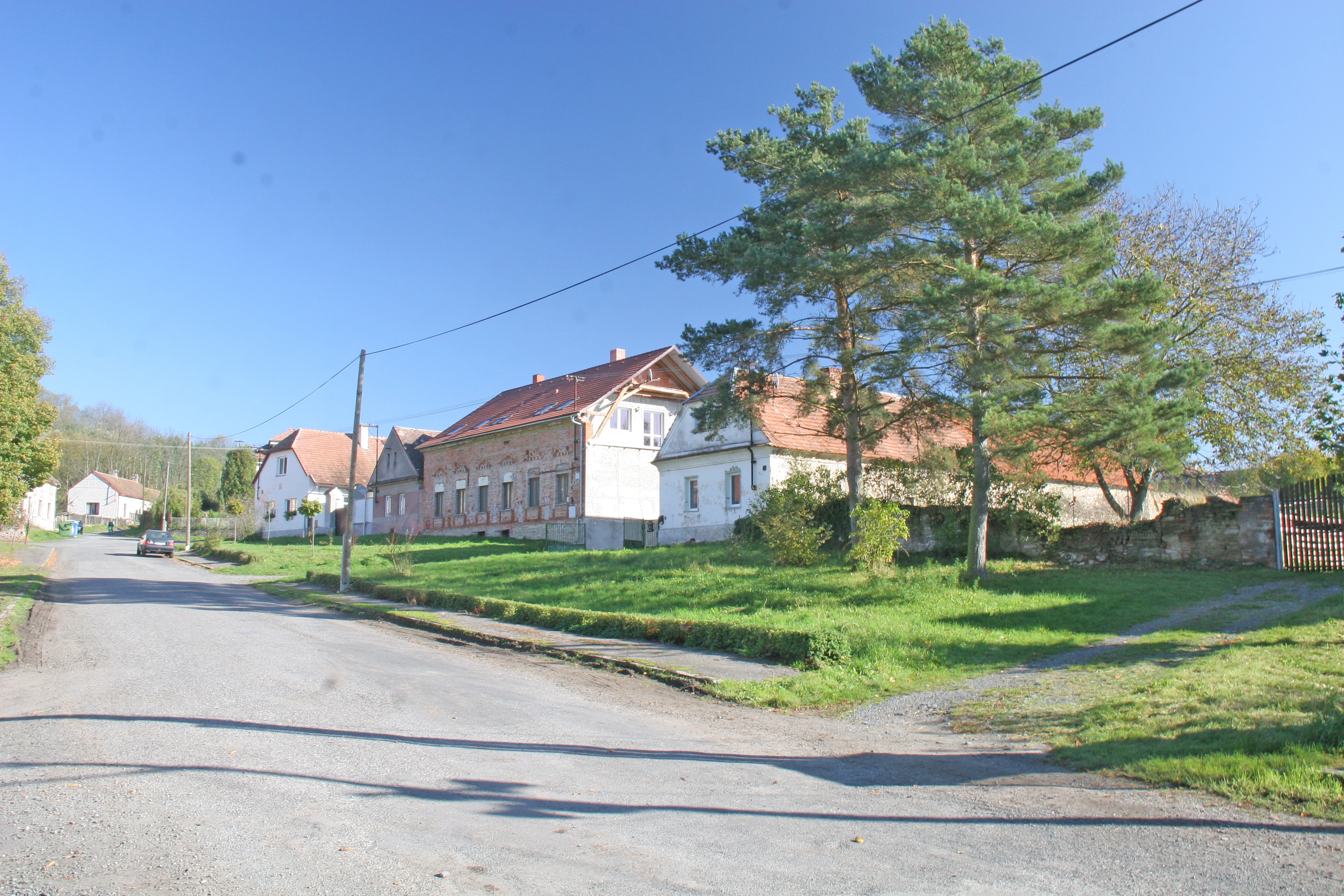
- Main street

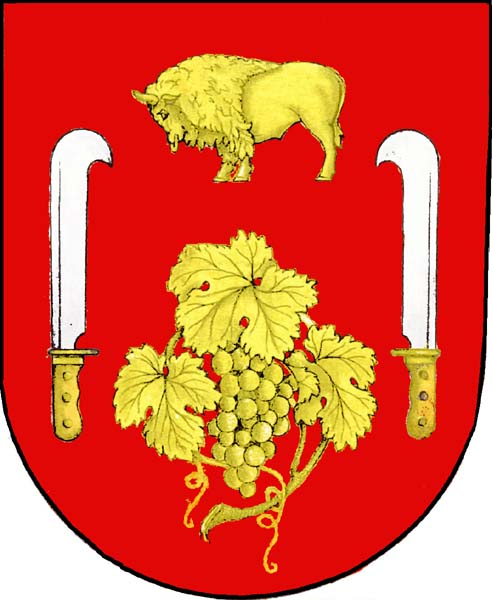
- Coat of arms

- Location in the Czech Republic
- Coordinates: 49°54′33″N 15°30′5″E
- Country: Czech Republic
- Region: Central Bohemian
- District: Kutná Hora
- First mentioned: 1192

Area
  - Total: 5.13 km^{2} (1.98 sq mi)
- Elevation: 265 m (869 ft)

Population (2026-01-01)
  - Total: 265
  - Density: 51.7/km^{2} (134/sq mi)
- Time zone: UTC+1 (CET)
  - Summer (DST): UTC+2 (CEST)
- Postal code: 286 01
- Website: www.vinare.cz

Vinaře is a municipality and village in Kutná Hora District in the Central Bohemian Region of the Czech Republic. It has about 300 inhabitants.

== Administrative division ==
Vinaře consists of two municipal parts (in brackets population according to the 2021 census):

- Vinaře (165)
- Vinice (94)

== Etymology ==
The name is derived from the Czech word vinař (i.e. 'winemaker', 'wine grower'), meaning "the village of winemakers". The name Vinice means 'vineyard'.

== Geography ==
Vinaře is located about 17 kilometres (11 mi) east of Kutná Hora and 23 km (14 mi) southwest of Pardubice. It lies in an agricultural landscape of the Central Elbe Table. The highest point is at 296 m (971 ft) above sea level. The Doubrava River briefly crosses the municipal territory in the west.

== History ==
The first written mention of Vinaře is from 1192, when half of the village was donated to the Teutonic Order. In 1242, the order acquired the second half of the village. In 1420, Vinaře was annexed to the Lichnice estate and acquired by the Trčka of Lípa family. From the end of the 16th century until the establishment of an independent municipality in 1850, Vinaře belonged to the Žleby estate.

The village of Vinice was founded around 1784 by Count Adam Auersperg. It was established on the site of the former village of Drbohlavy, which disappeared centuries ago.

== Demographics ==
Historical population

Year	Pop.	±%
1869	722	—
1880	848	+17.5%
1890	926	+9.2%
1900	934	+0.9%
1910	893	−4.4%

Year	Pop.	±%
1921	903	+1.1%
1930	818	−9.4%
1950	556	−32.0%
1961	522	−6.1%
1970	465	−10.9%

Year	Pop.	±%
1980	340	−26.9%
1991	276	−18.8%
2001	215	−22.1%
2011	239	+11.2%
2021	259	+8.4%

Source: Censuses

== Economy ==
Vinaře was known for wine growing, but the vineyards almost disappeared during the Thirty Years' War. In the second half of the 20th century, the vineyards were restored. As of 2024, there are over 11 hectares (27 acres) of vineyards in the municipal territory.

== Transport ==
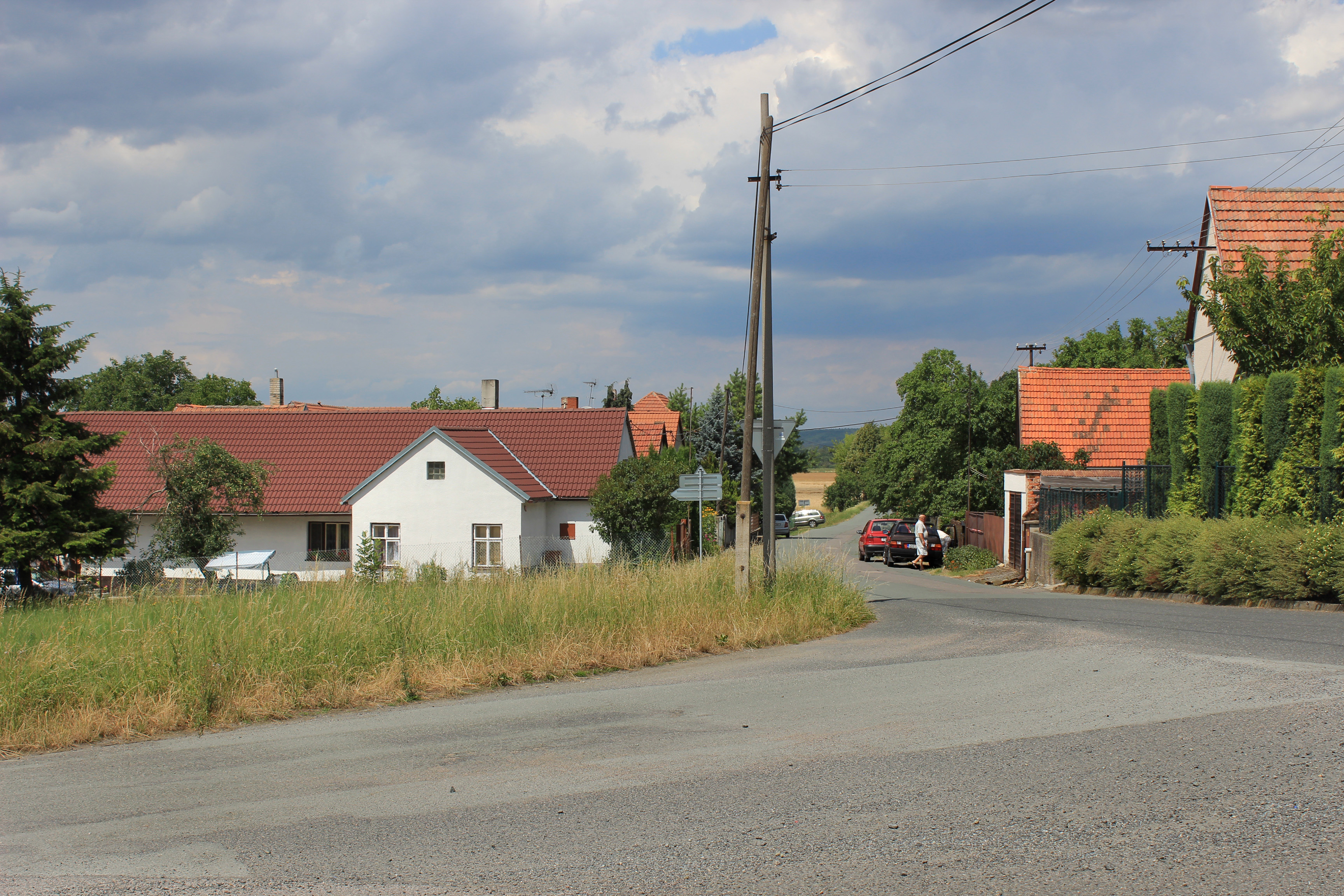
Centre of Vinice

There are no railways or major roads passing through the municipality.

== Sights ==
There are no protected cultural monuments in the municipality.
