= Záboří nad Labem =

- Municipality
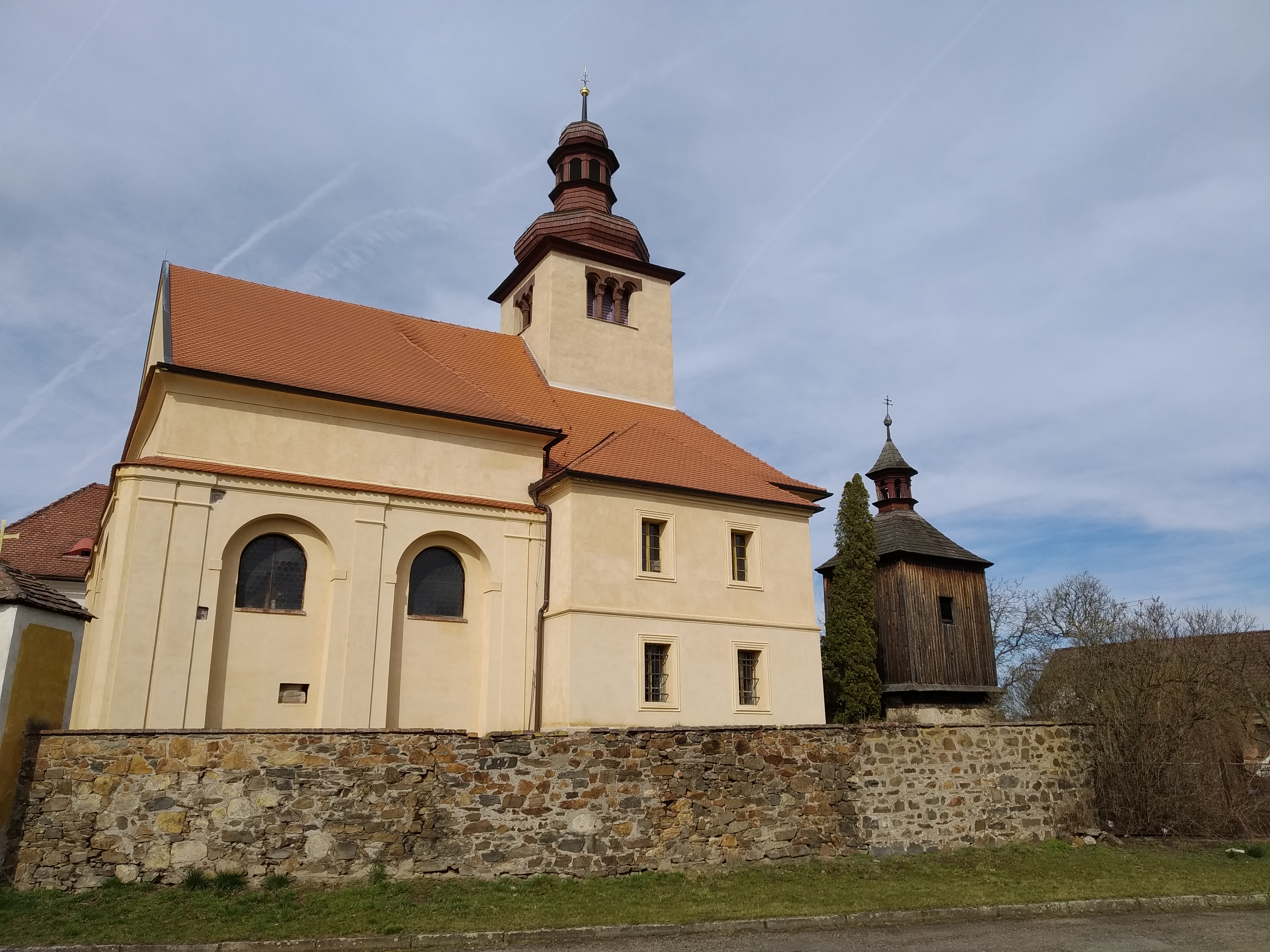
- Church of Saint Procopius

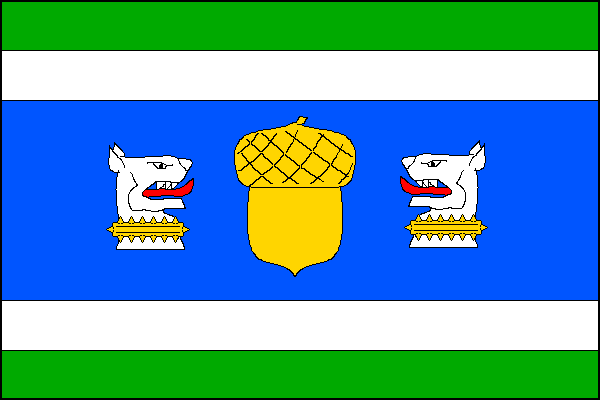
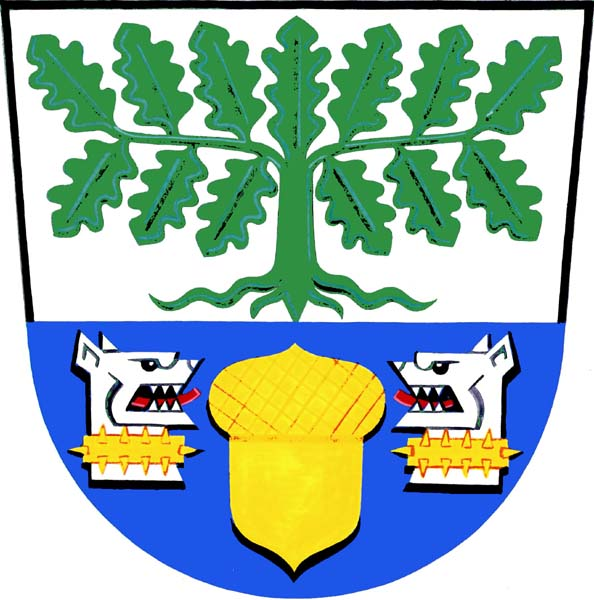
- Flag Coat of arms

- Location in the Czech Republic
- Coordinates: 50°1′31″N 15°21′0″E
- Country: Czech Republic
- Region: Central Bohemian
- District: Kutná Hora
- First mentioned: 1338

Area
  - Total: 8.93 km^{2} (3.45 sq mi)
- Elevation: 203 m (666 ft)

Population (2026-01-01)
  - Total: 832
  - Density: 93.2/km^{2} (241/sq mi)
- Time zone: UTC+1 (CET)
  - Summer (DST): UTC+2 (CEST)
- Postal code: 285 74
- Website: www.zaborinadlabem.cz

Záboří nad Labem is a municipality and village in Kutná Hora District in the Central Bohemian Region of the Czech Republic. It has about 800 inhabitants.

== Administrative division ==
Záboří nad Labem consists of two municipal parts (in brackets population according to the 2021 census):

- Záboří nad Labem (722)
- Habrkovice (113)

== Etymology ==
The name Záboří is derived from the Czech word bor ('pine forest') and the expression za borem ('behind the pine forest'), which referred to the location of the village. The suffix nad Labem ('upon the Elbe') serves to distinguish it from other places with the same name.

== Geography ==
Záboří nad Labem is located about 9 kilometres (6 mi) northeast of Kutná Hora and 29 km (18 mi) west of Pardubice. It lies mostly in a flat landscape in the Central Elbe Table, only a small part of the municipal territory in the northwest extends into the Iron Mountains. The highest point is at 242 m (794 ft) above sea level. The municipality is situated at the confluence of the Elbe and Doubrava rivers.

== History ==
The first written mention of Záboří nad Labem is from 1338, when the village was owned by the Sedlec Abbey. During the Hussite Wars, the abbey was burned down, and Záboří nad Labem was annexed to the Kolín estate in 1436. That lasted until 1636, when the village was acquired by marriage by Bedřich Kašpar Švihovský and annexed to the Nové Dvory estate.

== Demographics ==
Historical population

Year	Pop.	±%
1869	765	—
1880	877	+14.6%
1890	972	+10.8%
1900	1,009	+3.8%
1910	1,056	+4.7%

Year	Pop.	±%
1921	1,079	+2.2%
1930	961	−10.9%
1950	884	−8.0%
1961	943	+6.7%
1970	913	−3.2%

Year	Pop.	±%
1980	846	−7.3%
1991	780	−7.8%
2001	775	−0.6%
2011	824	+6.3%
2021	835	+1.3%

Source: Censuses

== Transport ==
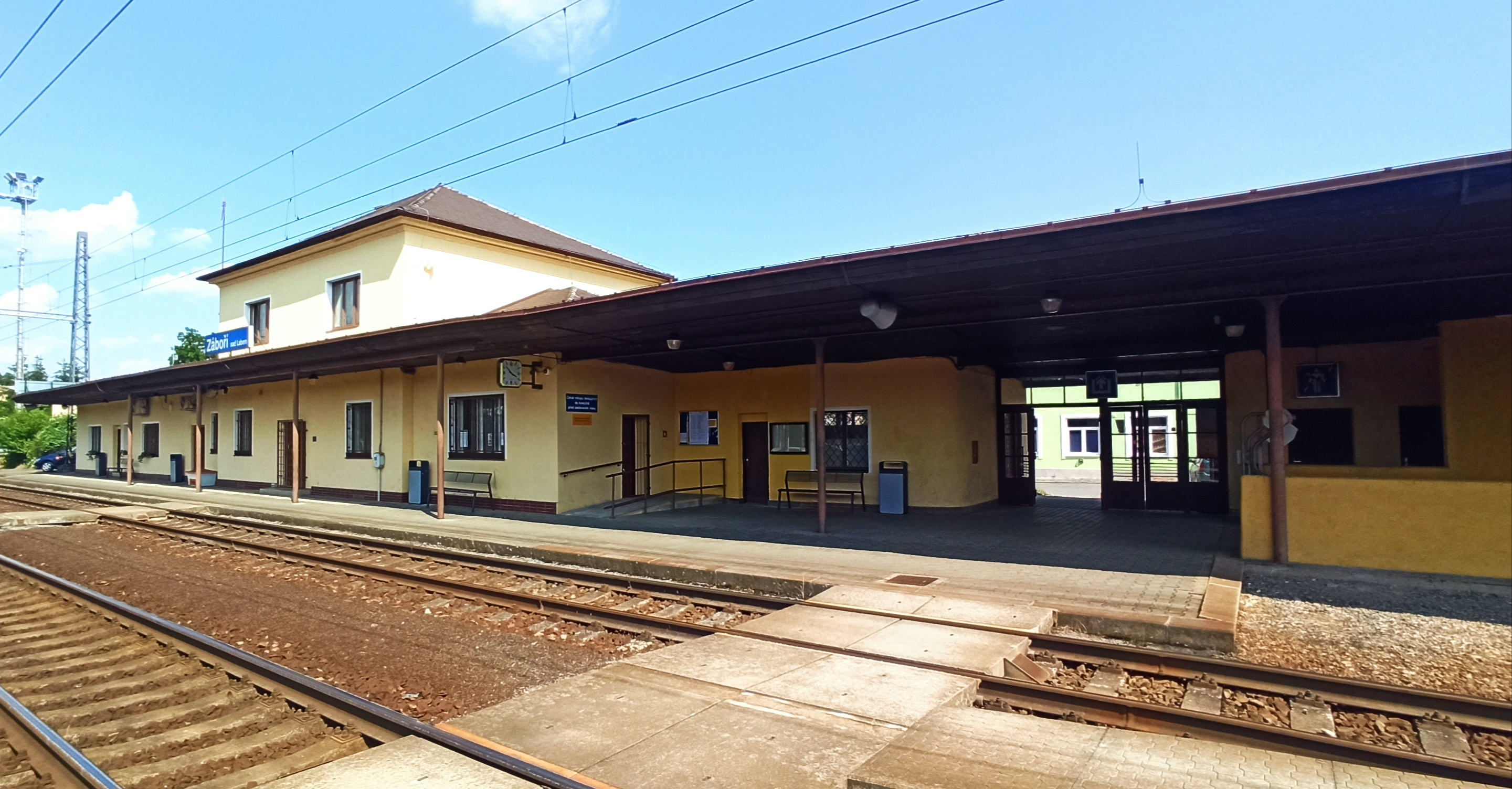
Train station

The I/2 road (the section from Kutná Hora to Pardubice) runs through the southern part of the municipality.

Záboří nad Labem is located on the railway line Kolín–Česká Třebová.

== Sights ==
The main landmark of Záboří nad Labem is the Church of Saint Procopius. It was originally a Romanesque church from the mid-12th century, rebuilt in the early Baroque style. Next to the church is a separate wooden bell tower.
