= Bílé Podolí =

- Market town
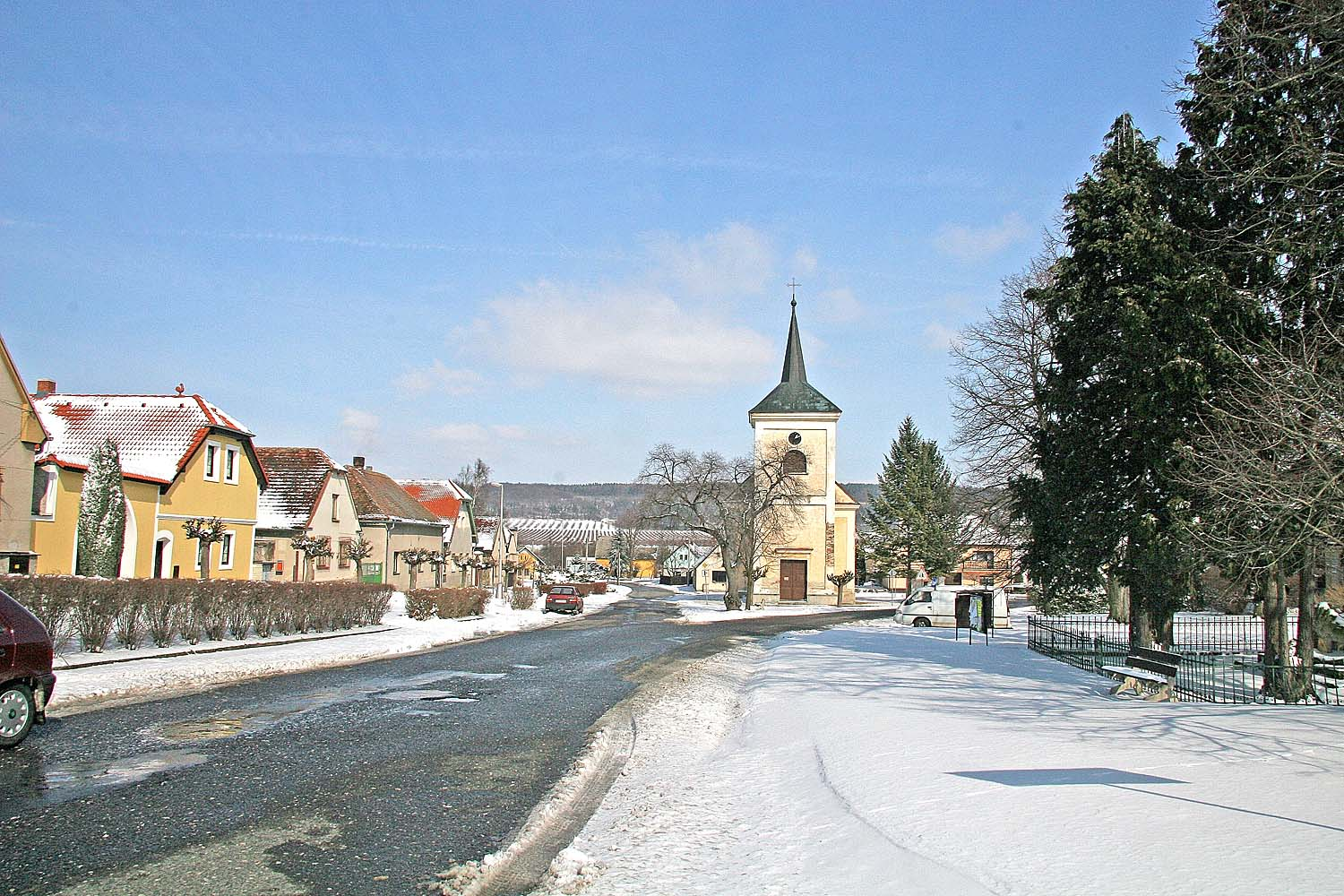
- Centre of Bílé Podolí

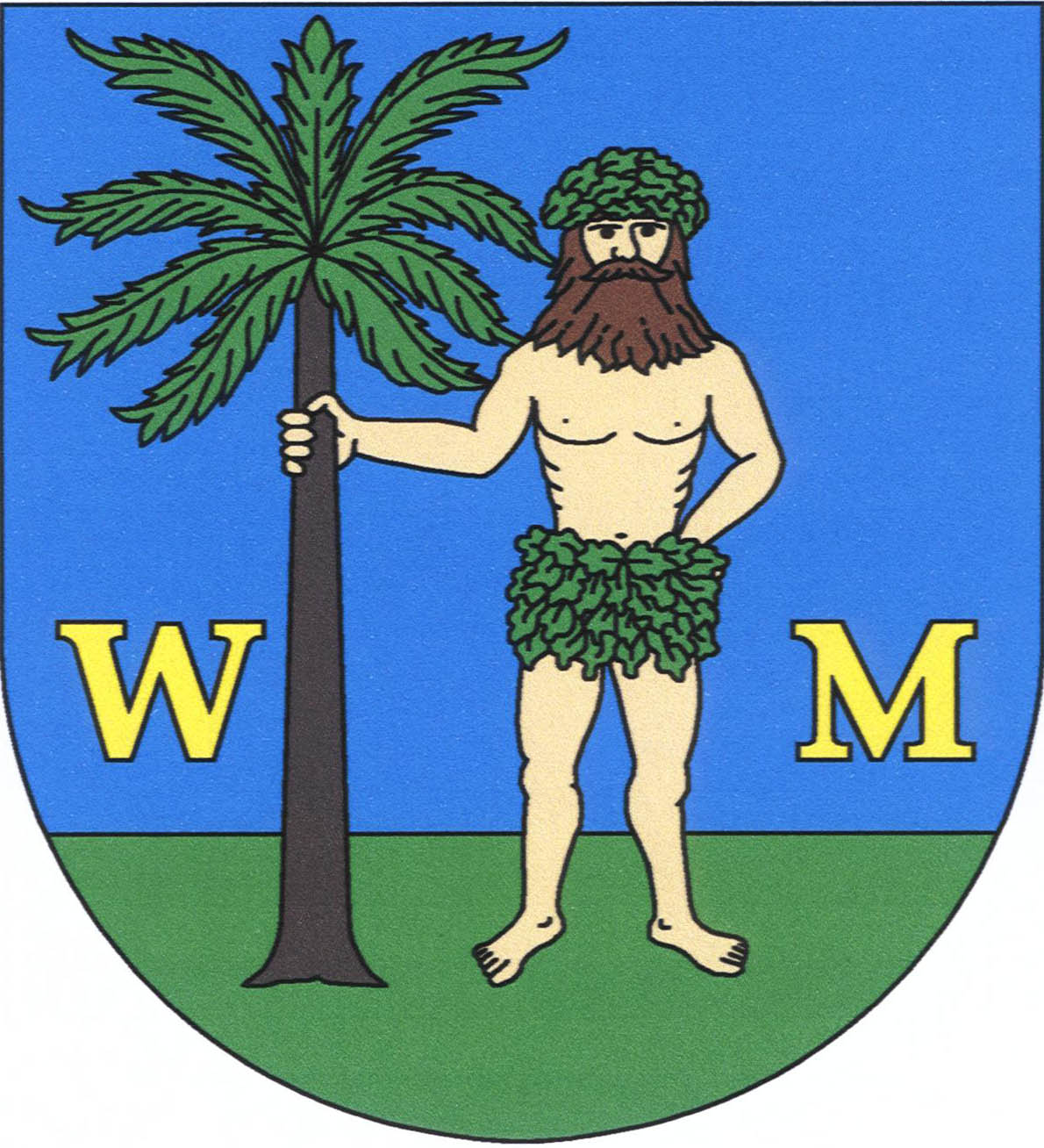
- Flag Coat of arms

- Location in the Czech Republic
- Coordinates: 49°57′24″N 15°29′28″E
- Country: Czech Republic
- Region: Central Bohemian
- District: Kutná Hora
- First mentioned: 1307

Area
  - Total: 15.29 km^{2} (5.90 sq mi)
- Elevation: 230 m (750 ft)

Population (2026-01-01)
  - Total: 582
  - Density: 38.1/km^{2} (98.6/sq mi)
- Time zone: UTC+1 (CET)
  - Summer (DST): UTC+2 (CEST)
- Postal codes: 285 72, 286 01
- Website: www.bilepodoli.cz

Bílé Podolí (Czech pronunciation: [ˈbiːlɛː ˈpodoliː]) is a market town in Kutná Hora District in the Central Bohemian Region of the Czech Republic. It has about 600 inhabitants.

== Administrative division ==
Bílé Podolí consists of three municipal parts (in brackets population according to the 2021 census):

- Bílé Podolí (323)
- Lovčice (124)
- Zaříčany (122)

Lovčice forms an exclave of the municipal territory.

== Geography ==
Bílé Podolí is located about 15 kilometres (9 mi) east of Kutná Hora and 21 km (13 mi) west of Pardubice. It lies in a flat agricultural landscape in the Central Elbe Table. In the northeast, the slopes of the Iron Mountains begin and include the highest point of Bílé Podolí at 290 m (951 ft) above sea level. The Doubrava River flows along the western municipal border.

== History ==
The first written mention of Bílé Podolí is from 1307. The village was promoted to a market town in 1687 by Emperor Leopold I.

== Demographics ==
Historical population

Year	Pop.	±%
1869	1,606	—
1880	1,748	+8.8%
1890	1,726	−1.3%
1900	1,723	−0.2%
1910	1,607	−6.7%

Year	Pop.	±%
1921	1,625	+1.1%
1930	1,404	−13.6%
1950	1,109	−21.0%
1961	1,044	−5.9%
1970	843	−19.3%

Year	Pop.	±%
1980	728	−13.6%
1991	600	−17.6%
2001	574	−4.3%
2011	612	+6.6%
2021	569	−7.0%

Source: Censuses

== Transport ==
The I/19 road from Čáslav to Chrudim and Vysoké Mýto runs between Bílé Podolí and its exclave of Lovčice.

== Sights ==
The main landmark of Bílé Podolí is the Church of Saint Wenceslaus. It was built in the late Gothic style probably at the end of the 14th century. The early Baroque reconstruction took place in the 1670s, further modifications were made after the fire in 1713. In 1821, the church was rebuilt into its current form with a Neoclassical façade.
