= Sobíňov =

- Municipality
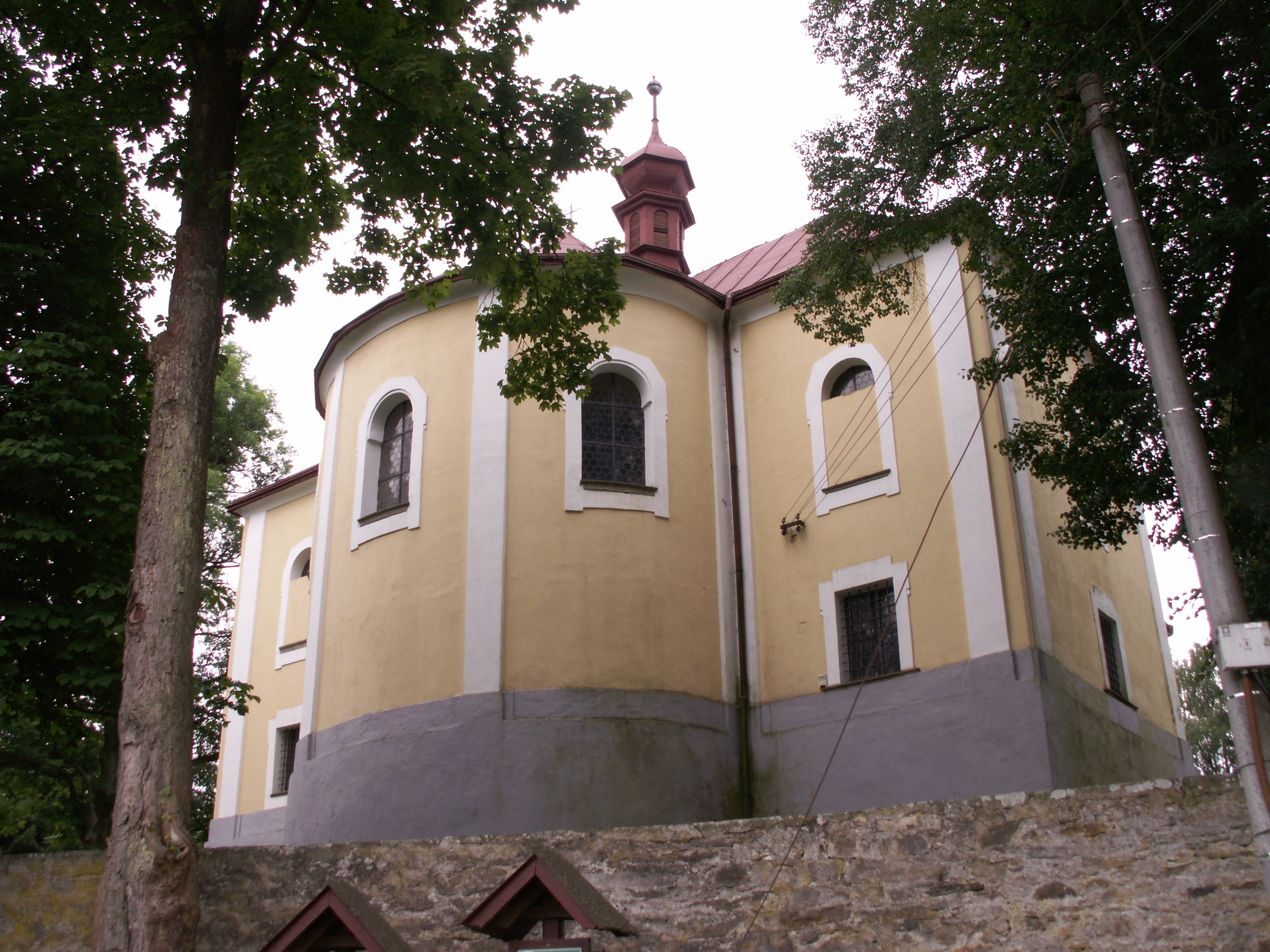
- Church of the Visitation of the Virgin Mary

- Flag Coat of arms

- Location in the Czech Republic
- Coordinates: 49°42′4″N 15°46′0″E
- Country: Czech Republic
- Region: Vysočina
- District: Havlíčkův Brod
- First mentioned: 1358

Area
  - Total: 6.06 km^{2} (2.34 sq mi)
- Elevation: 555 m (1,821 ft)

Population (2026-01-01)
  - Total: 724
  - Density: 119/km^{2} (309/sq mi)
- Time zone: UTC+1 (CET)
  - Summer (DST): UTC+2 (CEST)
- Postal codes: 582 62, 582 63
- Website: obecsobinov.cz

Sobíňov is a municipality and village in Havlíčkův Brod District in the Vysočina Region of the Czech Republic. It has about 700 inhabitants.

== Etymology ==
The name is derived from the personal name Soběn, meaning "Soběn's (farmyard)".

== Geography ==
Sobíňov is located about 16 kilometres (10 mi) northeast of Havlíčkův Brod and 34 km (21 mi) northeast of Jihlava. It lies in the Upper Sázava Hills. The highest point is at 591 m (1,939 ft) above sea level. The Doubrava River flows through the municipality. The area on the left bank of the river within the municipality is protected as a nature reserve called Niva Doubravy ('floodplain of the Doubrava').

== History ==
A trade route in the area of Sobíňov is documented already in 1144. The first written mention of Sobíňov is from 1358, when a fortress was built here. At the end of the 14th century, it was administratively joined to the Kunštát estate. In the 16th century, it was owned by the noble Trčka of Lípa family, and then it was joined to the Polná estate.

== Demographics ==
Historical population

Year	Pop.	±%
1869	1,216	—
1880	1,105	−9.1%
1890	1,138	+3.0%
1900	1,095	−3.8%
1910	1,125	+2.7%

Year	Pop.	±%
1921	1,057	−6.0%
1930	1,069	+1.1%
1950	820	−23.3%
1961	789	−3.8%
1970	757	−4.1%

Year	Pop.	±%
1980	704	−7.0%
1991	611	−13.2%
2001	600	−1.8%
2011	684	+14.0%
2021	710	+3.8%

Source: Censuses

== Transport ==
Sobíňov is located on the railway line Pardubice–Havlíčkův Brod.

== Sights ==
Sobíňov is known for a pilgrimage site called Sopoty with the Church of the Visitation of the Virgin Mary. The church was built in the Baroque style in 1749–1752.
