= Radostín (Žďár nad Sázavou District) =

- Municipality
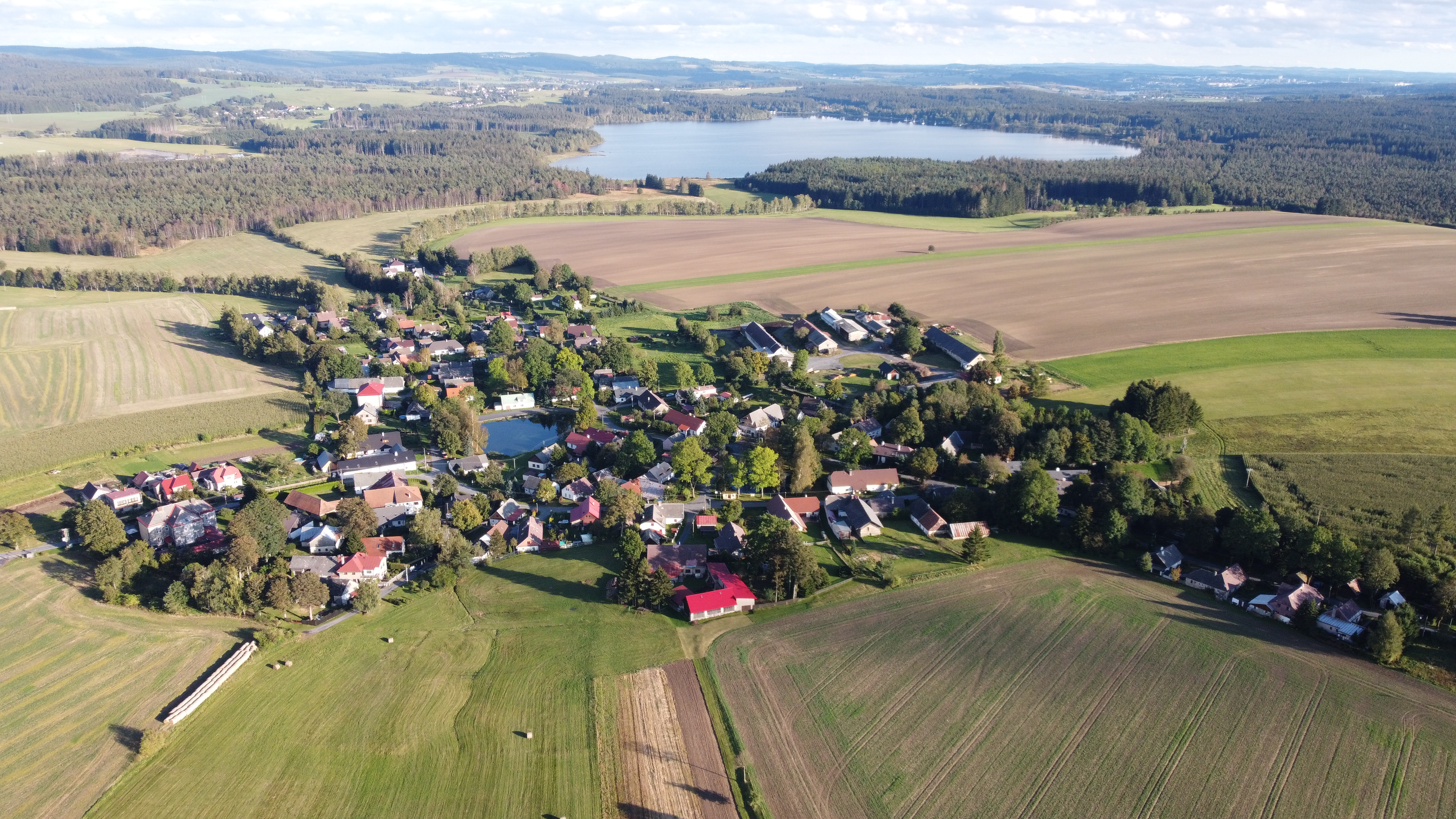
- Aerial view

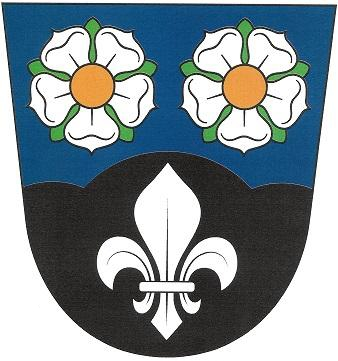
- Coat of arms

- Location in the Czech Republic
- Coordinates: 49°39′10″N 15°52′33″E
- Country: Czech Republic
- Region: Vysočina
- District: Žďár nad Sázavou
- First mentioned: 1454

Area
  - Total: 10.69 km^{2} (4.13 sq mi)
- Elevation: 628 m (2,060 ft)

Population (2026-01-01)
  - Total: 153
  - Density: 14.3/km^{2} (37.1/sq mi)
- Time zone: UTC+1 (CET)
  - Summer (DST): UTC+2 (CEST)
- Postal code: 591 01
- Website: www.radostin.cz

Radostín is a municipality and village in Žďár nad Sázavou District in the Vysočina Region of the Czech Republic. It has about 200 inhabitants.

Radostín lies approximately 11 kilometres (7 mi) north-west of Žďár nad Sázavou, 34 km (21 mi) north-east of Jihlava, and 115 km (71 mi) south-east of Prague. The Doubrava River originates in the municipal territory.

== Demographics ==
Historical population
Year	Pop.	±%
1869	677	—
1880	614	−9.3%
1890	549	−10.6%
1900	565	+2.9%
1910	626	+10.8%
1921	547	−12.6%
1930	564	+3.1%
1950	340	−39.7%
1961	289	−15.0%
1970	264	−8.7%
1980	232	−12.1%
1991	181	−22.0%
2001	165	−8.8%
2011	151	−8.5%
2021	144	−4.6%
Source: Censuses
