= Krucemburk =

- Market town
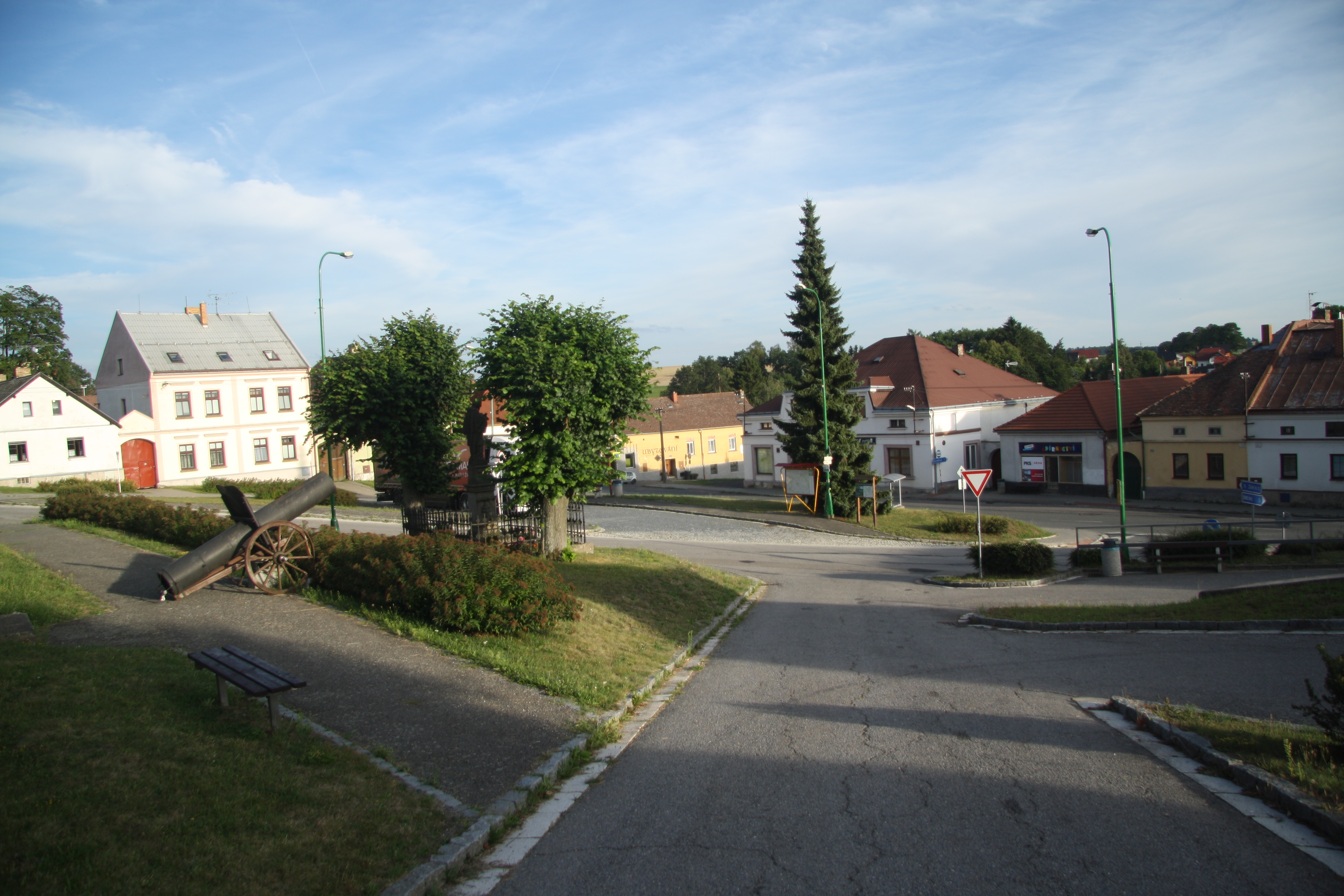
- The square Náměstí Jana Zrzavého

- Flag Coat of arms

- Location in the Czech Republic
- Coordinates: 49°41′18″N 15°51′8″E
- Country: Czech Republic
- Region: Vysočina
- District: Havlíčkův Brod
- First mentioned: 1241

Area
  - Total: 29.18 km^{2} (11.27 sq mi)
- Elevation: 567 m (1,860 ft)

Population (2026-01-01)
  - Total: 1,583
  - Density: 54.25/km^{2} (140.5/sq mi)
- Time zone: UTC+1 (CET)
  - Summer (DST): UTC+2 (CEST)
- Postal codes: 582 63, 582 66
- Website: www.krucemburk.cz

Krucemburk (Czech pronunciation: [ˈkrutsɛmburk]; in 1949–1993 Křížová; German: Kreuzberg) is a market town in Havlíčkův Brod District in the Vysočina Region of the Czech Republic. It has about 1,600 inhabitants.

== Administrative division ==
Krucemburk consists of three municipal parts (in brackets population according to the 2021 census):

- Krucemburk (1,268)
- Hluboká (67)
- Staré Ransko (183)

== Etymology ==
The initial name of Krucemburk was Kreuzburg. The name was derived from the German words Kreuz ('cross') and Burg ('castle') and referred to the Knights of the Cross with the Red Star, who were the founders of the settlement. Krucemburk is a Czech transcription of the German name and this name has been used since the 14th century. In the 18th century, the German name Kreuzberg appeared for the first time.

In 1949, the name was changed to Křížová (from kříž, which is the Czech word for 'cross'). However, in 1993, the market town returned to its historical name.

== Geography ==
Krucemburk is located about 21 kilometres (13 mi) northeast of Havlíčkův Brod and 36 km (22 mi) northeast of Jihlava. It lies on the border between the Upper Sázava Hills and Iron Mountains. The highest point is at 680 m (2,231 ft) above sea level. The Doubrava River flows through Hluboká and Staré Ransko. The municipal territory is rich in fishponds, the largest of which is Řeka. The entire territory of Krucemburk lies within the Žďárské vrchy Protected Landscape Area.

== History ==
The first written mention of Krucemburk is from 1241. The village was promoted to a market town in 1385. The village of Staré Ransko was founded in 1355. Hluboká was probably founded at the turn of the 13th and 14th centuries, but the first written mention is from 1548.

== Demographics ==
Historical population

Year	Pop.	±%
1869	2,586	—
1880	2,361	−8.7%
1890	2,474	+4.8%
1900	2,463	−0.4%
1910	2,449	−0.6%

Year	Pop.	±%
1921	2,317	−5.4%
1930	1,994	−13.9%
1950	2,077	+4.2%
1961	2,013	−3.1%
1970	1,821	−9.5%

Year	Pop.	±%
1980	1,780	−2.3%
1991	1,711	−3.9%
2001	1,627	−4.9%
2011	1,585	−2.6%
2021	1,518	−4.2%

Source: Censuses

== Transport ==
The I/37 road (the section from Žďár nad Sázavou to Chrudim) runs through the market town. The I/34 road from Havlíčkův Brod to Svitavy runs along the northern municipal border.

== Sights ==
The main landmark is the Church of Saint Nicholas. It is a Gothic building with Baroque modifications. The tower dates from the 13th century.

== Notable people ==
- Jan Zrzavý (1890–1977), painter; buried here
