= Vlačice =

- Municipality
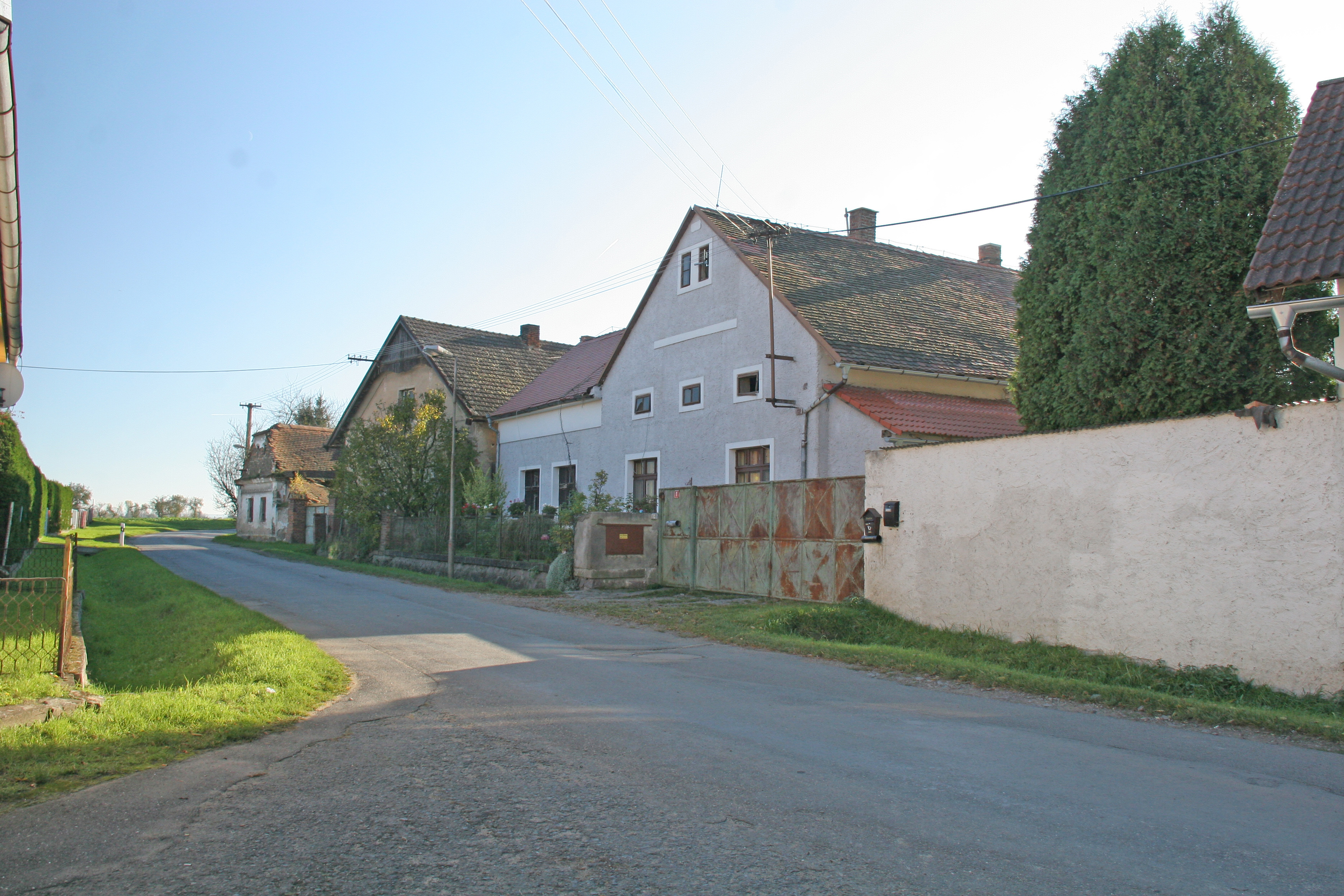
- A street in Vlačice

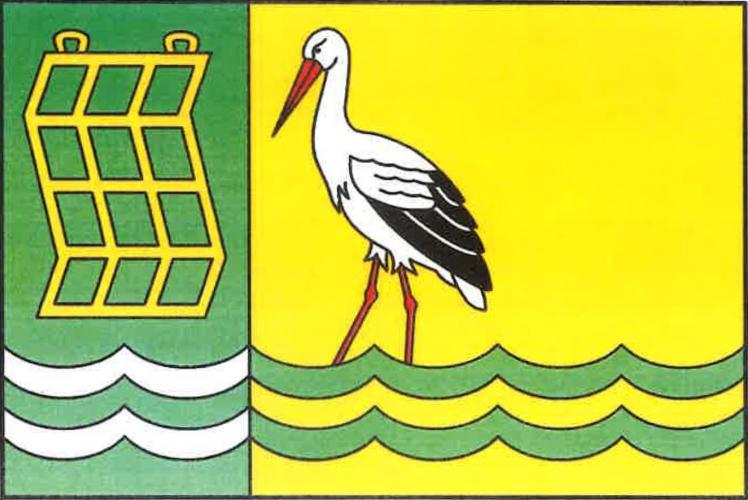
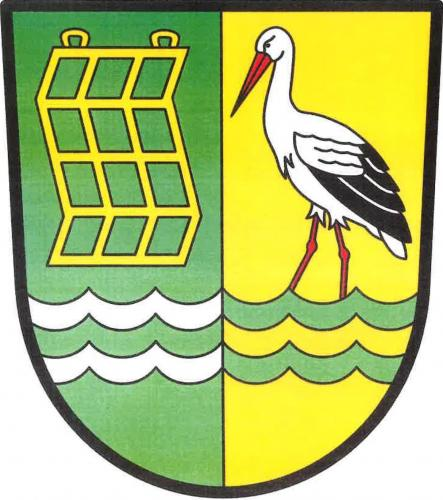
- Flag Coat of arms

- Location in the Czech Republic
- Coordinates: 49°56′35″N 15°26′15″E
- Country: Czech Republic
- Region: Central Bohemian
- District: Kutná Hora
- First mentioned: 1189

Area
  - Total: 5.27 km^{2} (2.03 sq mi)
- Elevation: 224 m (735 ft)

Population (2026-01-01)
  - Total: 251
  - Density: 47.6/km^{2} (123/sq mi)
- Time zone: UTC+1 (CET)
  - Summer (DST): UTC+2 (CEST)
- Postal code: 286 01
- Website: www.vlacice.cz

Vlačice is a municipality and village in Kutná Hora District in the Central Bohemian Region of the Czech Republic. It has about 300 inhabitants.

== Administrative division ==
Vlačice consists of two municipal parts (in brackets population according to the 2021 census):

- Vlačice (31)
- Výčapy (213)

== Etymology ==
The initial name of Vlačice was most likely Vladčice. The name was derived from the personal name Vladko (a shortened form of Vladislav), meaning "the village of Vladko's people".

== Geography ==
Vrdy is located about 12 kilometres (7 mi) east of Kutná Hora and 25 km (16 mi) southwest of Pardubice. It lies in a flat agricultural landscape in the Central Elbe Table. The Doubrava River flows along the eastern municipal border.

== History ==
The first written mention of Vlačice is from 1189, when it was owned by nobleman Hroznata of Peruc. Výčapy was first mentioned in 1277. From 1279 at the latest until the Hussite Wars, Vlačice belonged to the monastery in Vilémov, then the village was acquired by Emperor Sigismund. He donated the village to the Trčka of Lípa family, which owned Vlačice for more than 100 years. Among the next owners were various lesser noblemen. From 1612 until the establishment of an independent municipality in 1848, Vlačice was part of the Žehušice estate.

== Demographics ==
Historical population

| Year | Pop. | ±% |
|---|---|---|
| 1869 | 399 | — |
| 1880 | 365 | −8.5% |
| 1890 | 342 | −6.3% |
| 1900 | 425 | +24.3% |
| 1910 | 420 | −1.2% |

| Year | Pop. | ±% |
|---|---|---|
| 1921 | 455 | +8.3% |
| 1930 | 437 | −4.0% |
| 1950 | 341 | −22.0% |
| 1961 | 389 | +14.1% |
| 1970 | 356 | −8.5% |

| Year | Pop. | ±% |
|---|---|---|
| 1980 | 336 | −5.6% |
| 1991 | 280 | −16.7% |
| 2001 | 263 | −6.1% |
| 2011 | 249 | −5.3% |
| 2021 | 244 | −2.0% |

Source: Censuses

== Transport ==
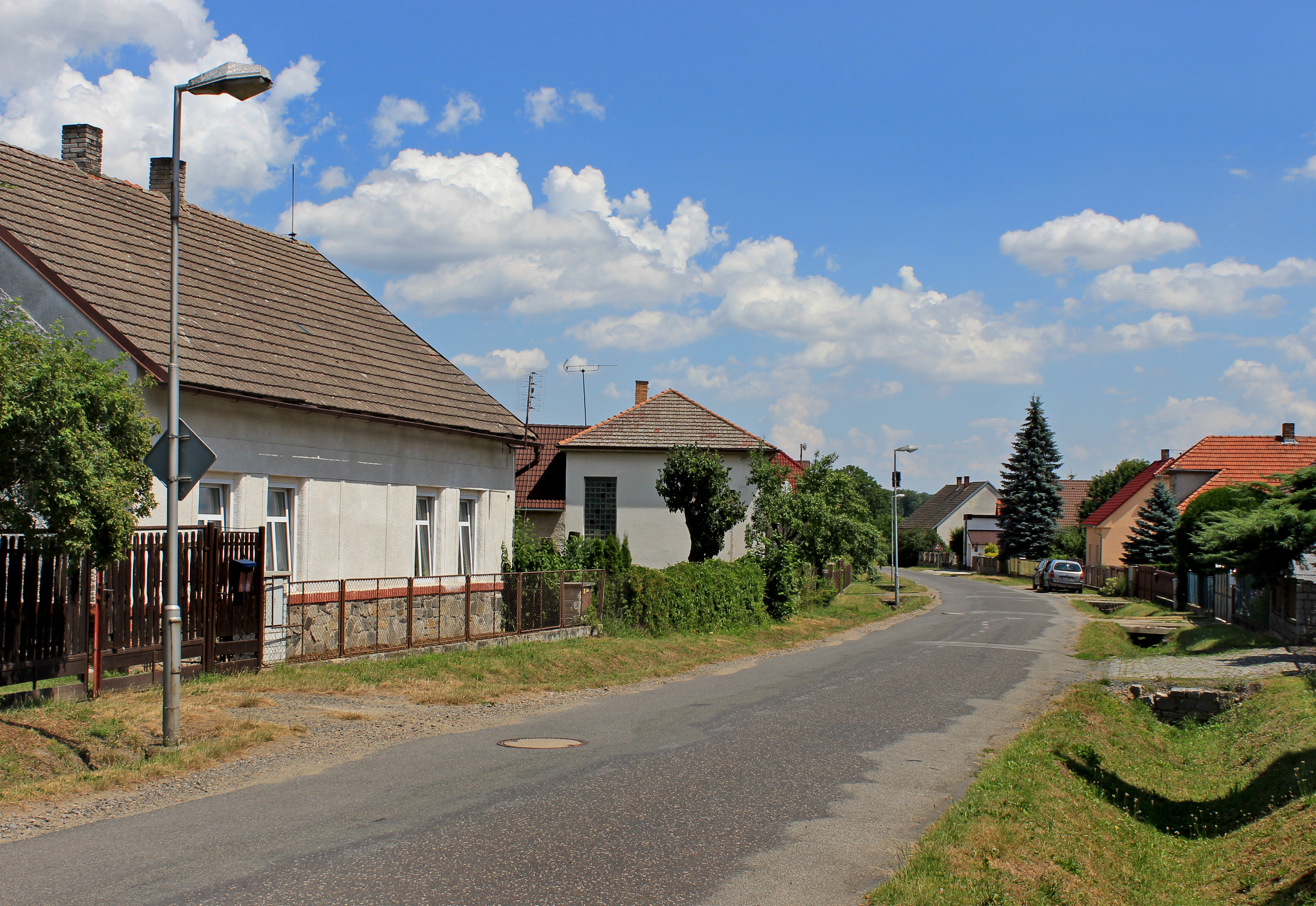
Main street in Výčapy

There are no railways or major roads passing through the municipality.

== Sights ==
There are no protected cultural monuments in the municipality. However, the northern part of the municipality with both villages belongs to a landscape monument zone called Žehušicko. It is a uniquely preserved document of Baroque urbanism and a Baroque composed landscape.
