= Kobylnice (Kutná Hora District) =

- Municipality
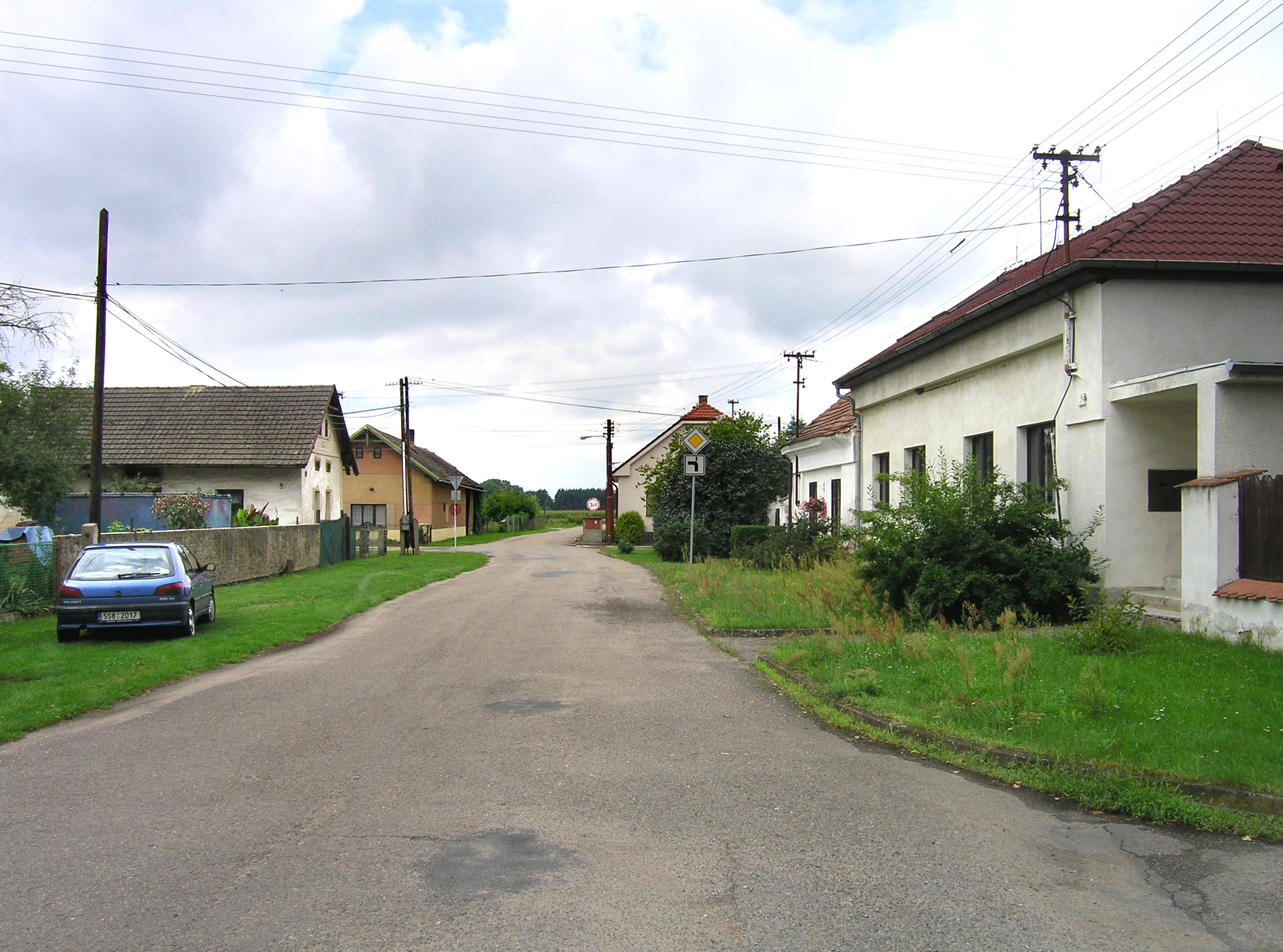
- Northern part of Kobylnice

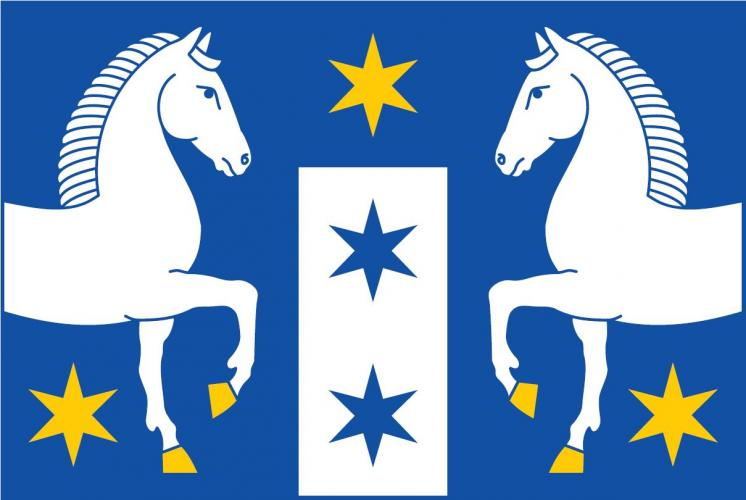
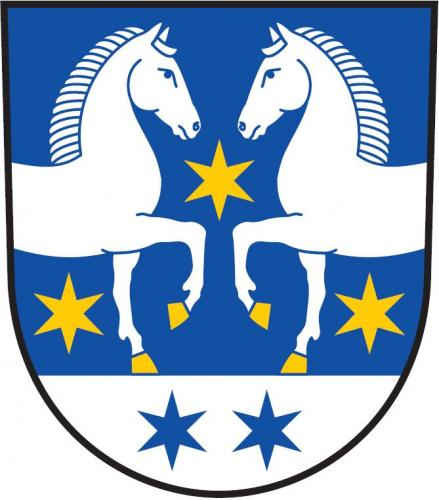
- Flag Coat of arms

- Location in the Czech Republic
- Coordinates: 50°0′23″N 15°22′33″E
- Country: Czech Republic
- Region: Central Bohemian
- District: Kutná Hora
- First mentioned: 1306

Area
  - Total: 2.37 km^{2} (0.92 sq mi)
- Elevation: 214 m (702 ft)

Population (2026-01-01)
  - Total: 224
  - Density: 94.5/km^{2} (245/sq mi)
- Time zone: UTC+1 (CET)
  - Summer (DST): UTC+2 (CEST)
- Postal code: 284 01
- Website: www.kobylnice-kh.cz

Kobylnice is a municipality and village in Kutná Hora District in the Central Bohemian Region of the Czech Republic. It has about 200 inhabitants.

== Demographics ==
Historical population
Year	Pop.	±%
1869	257	—
1880	250	−2.7%
1890	281	+12.4%
1900	265	−5.7%
1910	224	−15.5%
1921	227	+1.3%
1930	241	+6.2%
1950	190	−21.2%
1961	174	−8.4%
1970	189	+8.6%
1980	168	−11.1%
1991	184	+9.5%
2001	181	−1.6%
2011	198	+9.4%
2021	210	+6.1%
Source: Censuses
