= Čečkovice =

- Municipality
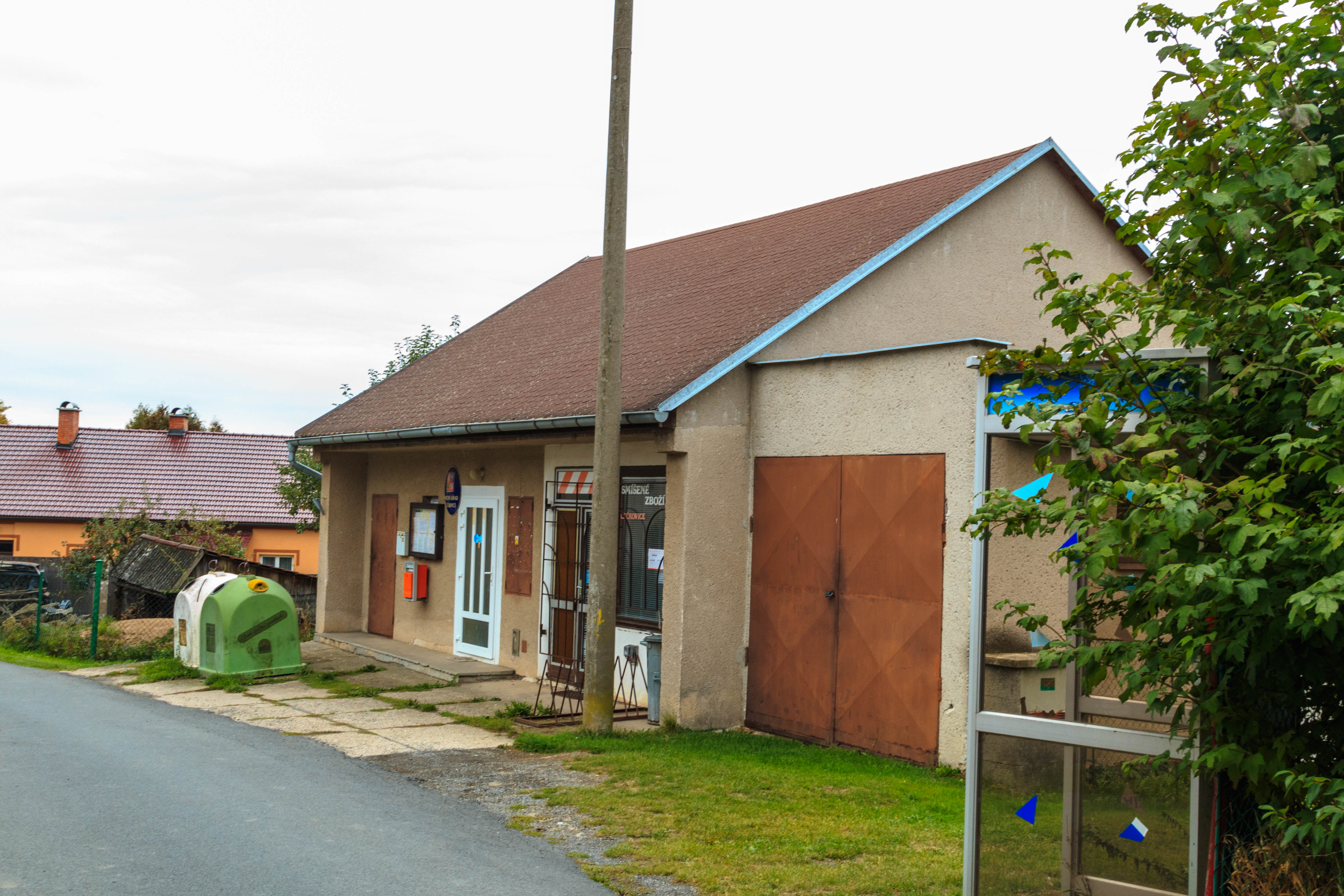
- Municipal office

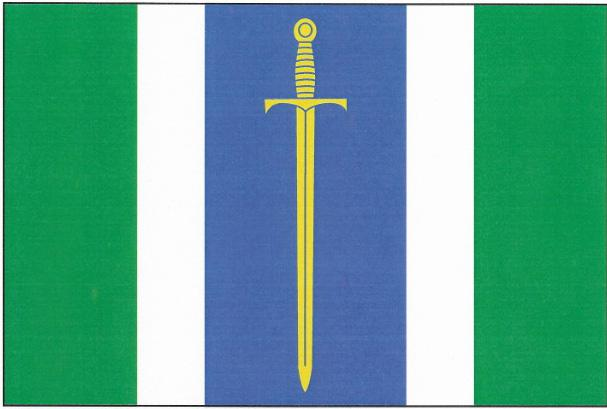
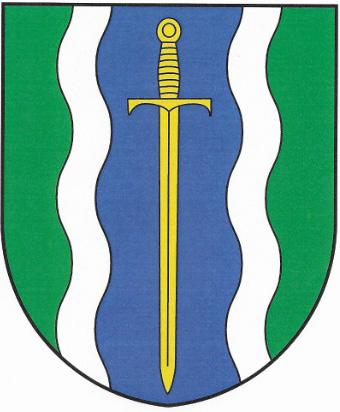
- Flag Coat of arms

- Location in the Czech Republic
- Coordinates: 49°47′5″N 15°39′50″E
- Country: Czech Republic
- Region: Vysočina
- District: Havlíčkův Brod
- First mentioned: 1542

Area
  - Total: 2.43 km^{2} (0.94 sq mi)
- Elevation: 405 m (1,329 ft)

Population (2026-01-01)
  - Total: 89
  - Density: 37/km^{2} (95/sq mi)
- Time zone: UTC+1 (CET)
  - Summer (DST): UTC+2 (CEST)
- Postal code: 583 01
- Website: www.ceckovice.cz

Čečkovice (Czech pronunciation: [ˈtʃɛtʃkovɪtsɛ]) is a municipality and village in Havlíčkův Brod District in the Vysočina Region of the Czech Republic. It has about 90 inhabitants.

Čečkovice lies approximately 21 kilometres (13 mi) north of Havlíčkův Brod, 44 km (27 mi) north of Jihlava, and 96 km (60 mi) east of Prague.

== Demographics ==
Historical population
Year	Pop.	±%
1869	200	—
1880	215	+7.5%
1890	204	−5.1%
1900	161	−21.1%
1910	179	+11.2%
1921	189	+5.6%
1930	179	−5.3%
1950	142	−20.7%
1961	157	+10.6%
1970	143	−8.9%
1980	111	−22.4%
1991	103	−7.2%
2001	97	−5.8%
2011	84	−13.4%
2021	87	+3.6%
Source: Censuses
