= Dolní Sokolovec =

- Municipality
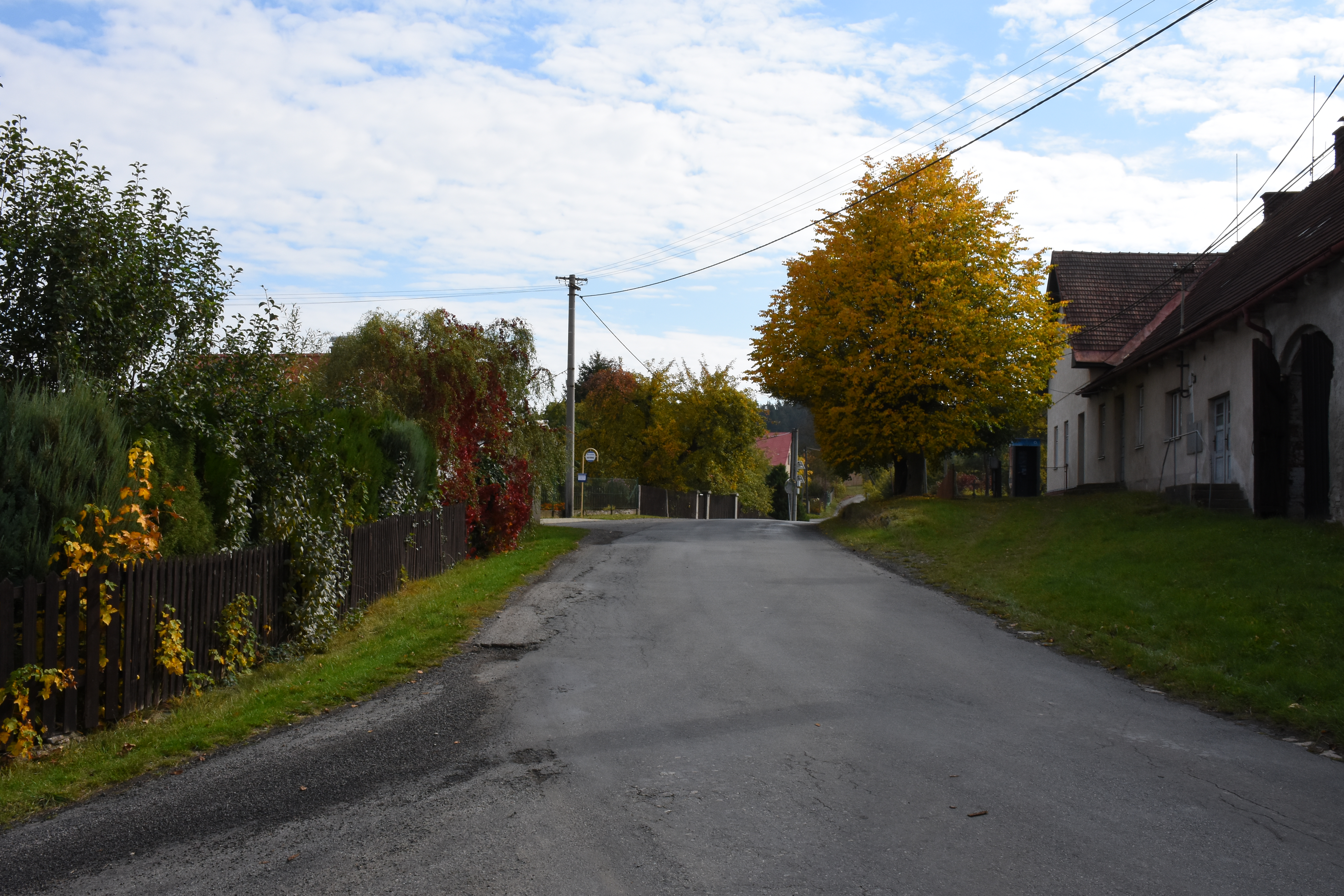
- Main street

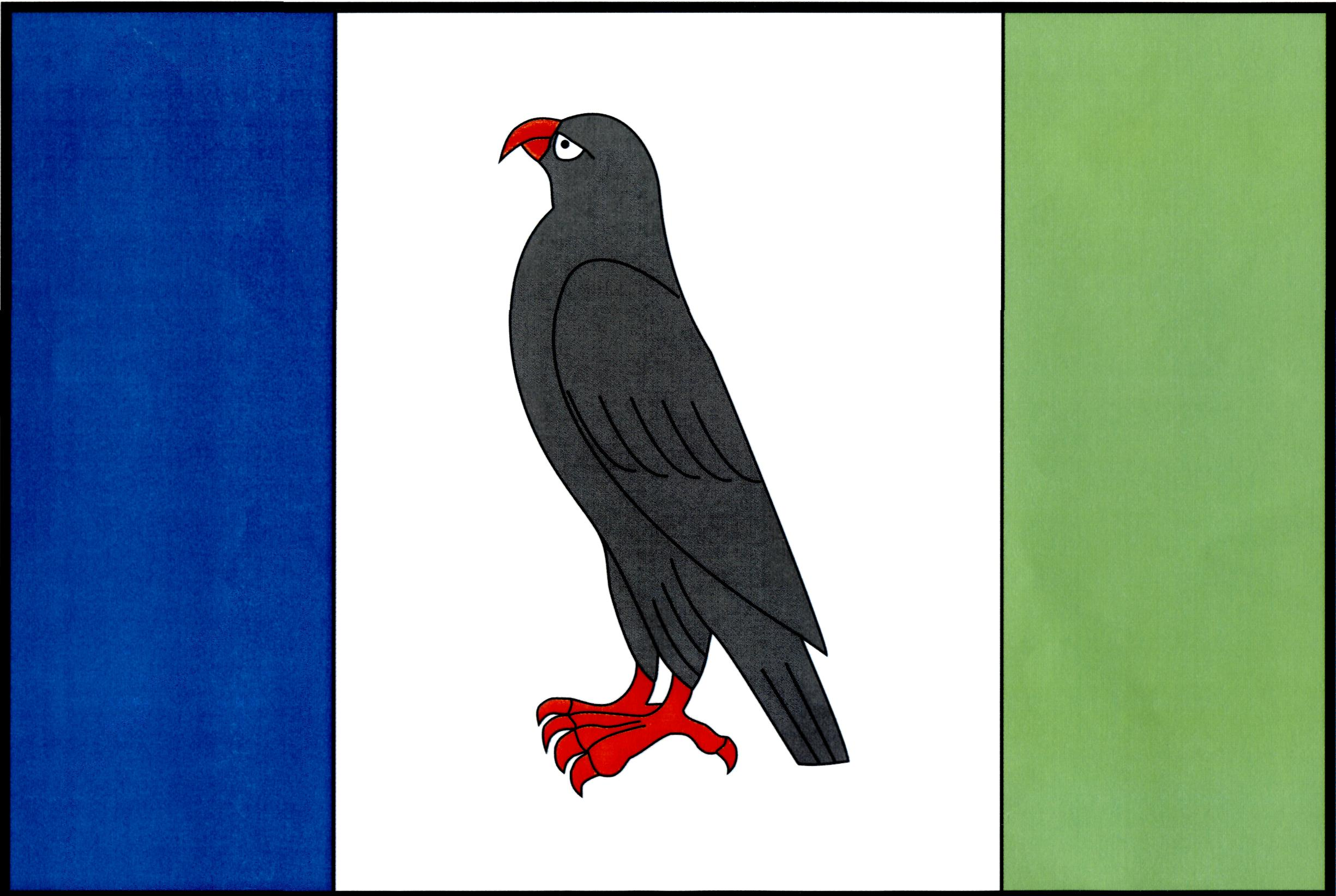
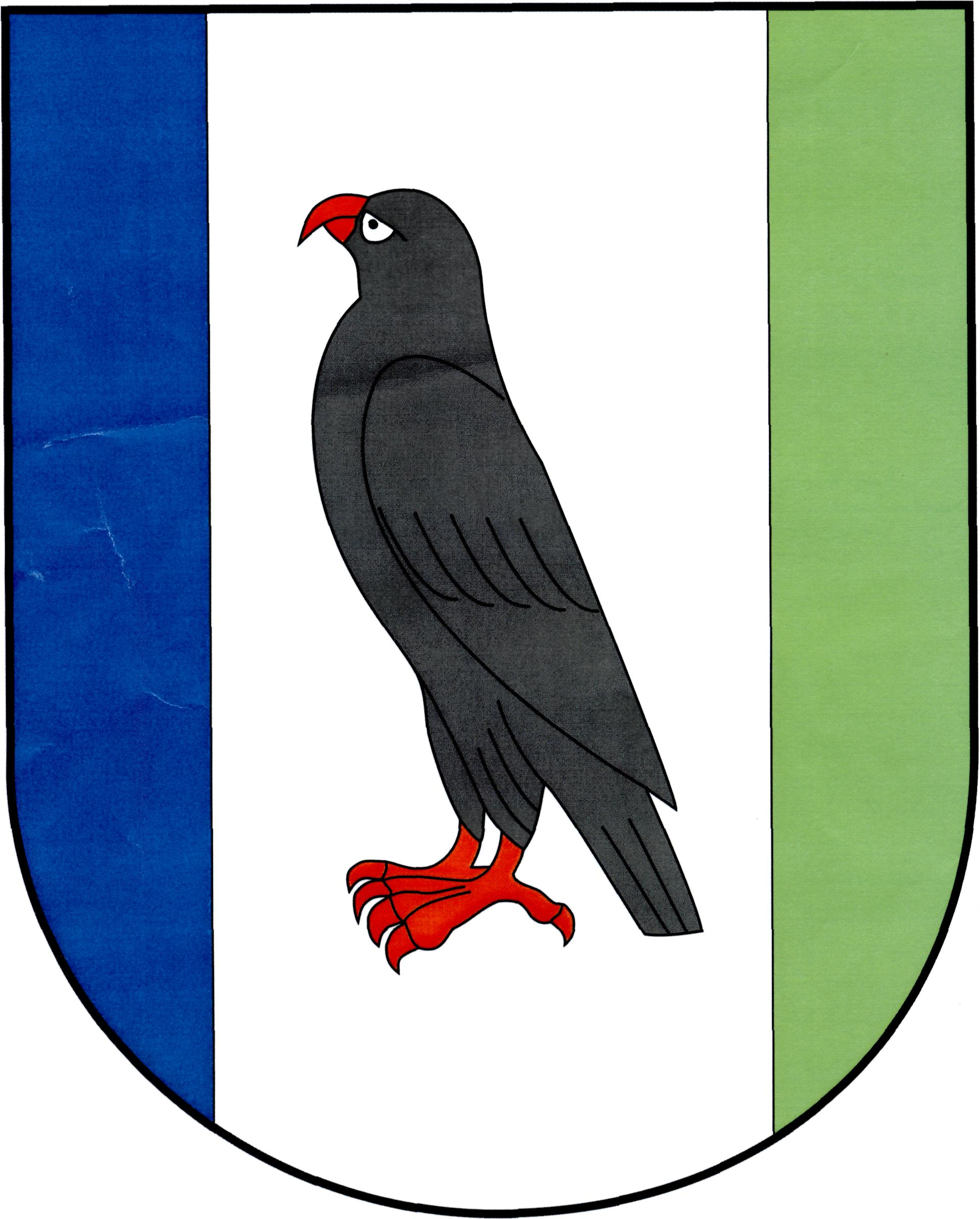
- Flag Coat of arms

- Location in the Czech Republic
- Coordinates: 49°43′36″N 15°42′55″E
- Country: Czech Republic
- Region: Vysočina
- District: Havlíčkův Brod
- First mentioned: 1454

Area
  - Total: 2.84 km^{2} (1.10 sq mi)
- Elevation: 461 m (1,512 ft)

Population (2026-01-01)
  - Total: 74
  - Density: 26/km^{2} (67/sq mi)
- Time zone: UTC+1 (CET)
  - Summer (DST): UTC+2 (CEST)
- Postal code: 583 01
- Website: www.dolnisokolovec.cz

Dolní Sokolovec is a municipality and village in Havlíčkův Brod District in the Vysočina Region of the Czech Republic. It has about 70 inhabitants.

Dolní Sokolovec lies approximately 17 kilometres (11 mi) north-east of Havlíčkův Brod, 38 km (24 mi) north of Jihlava, and 102 km (63 mi) south-east of Prague.

== Administrative division ==
Dolní Sokolovec consists of two municipal parts (in brackets population according to the 2021 census):

- Dolní Sokolovec (76)
- Horní Sokolovec (16)

== Demographics ==
Historical population
Year	Pop.	±%
1869	259	—
1880	285	+10.0%
1890	246	−13.7%
1900	226	−8.1%
1910	246	+8.8%
1921	240	−2.4%
1930	216	−10.0%
1950	169	−21.8%
1961	184	+8.9%
1970	156	−15.2%
1980	109	−30.1%
1991	87	−20.2%
2001	92	+5.7%
2011	105	+14.1%
2021	92	−12.4%
Source: Censuses
