= Nová Ves u Chotěboře =

- Municipality
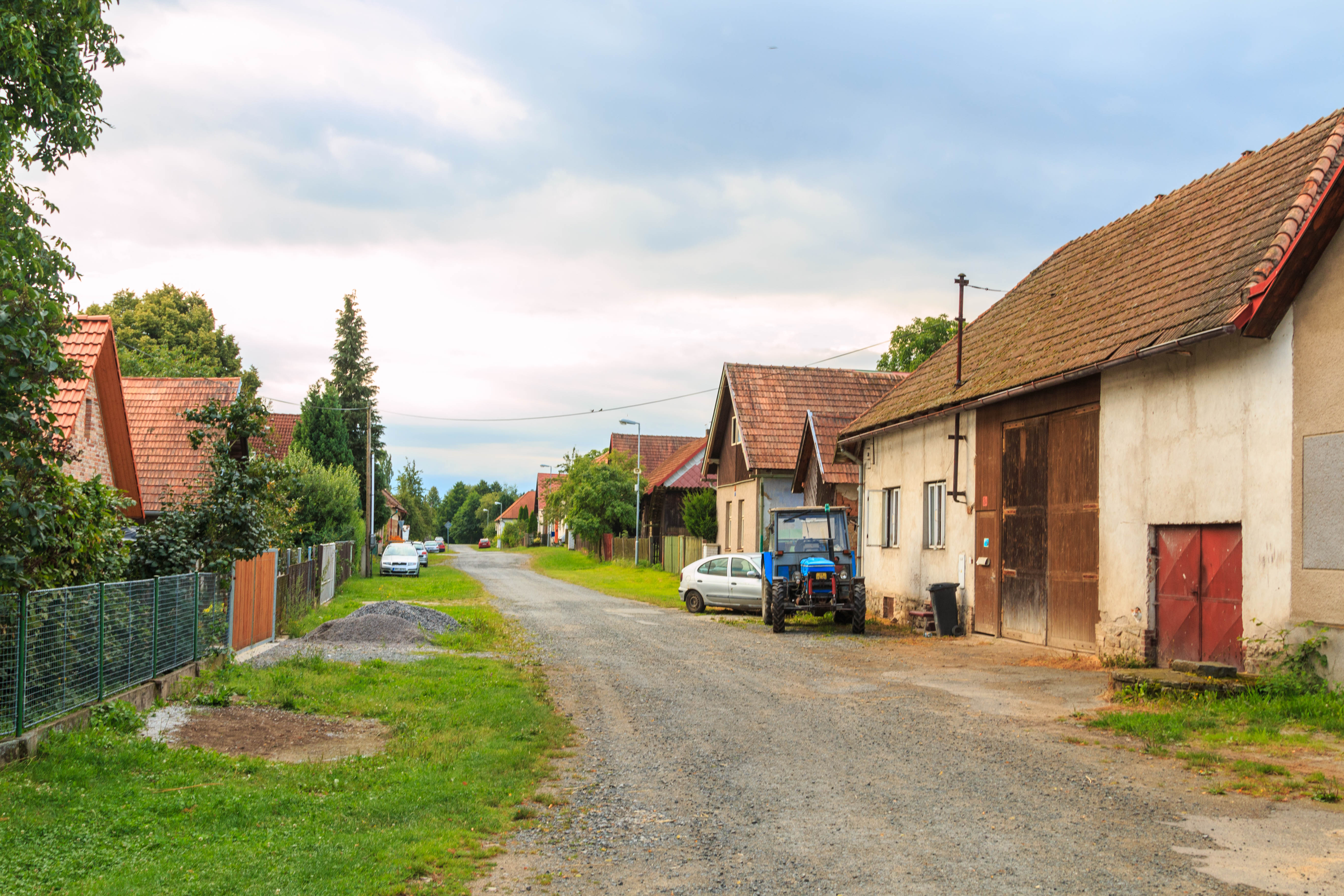
- Nový Dvůr, a part of Nová Ves u Chotěboře

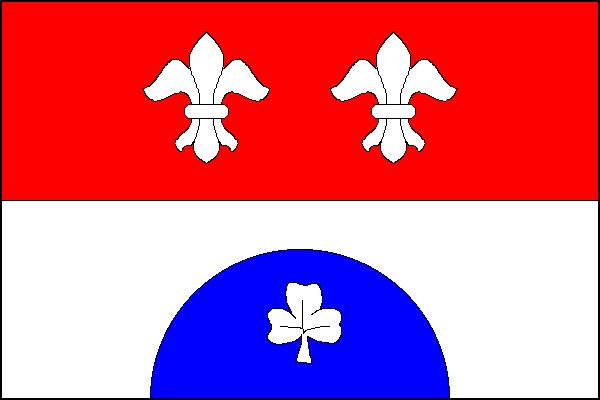
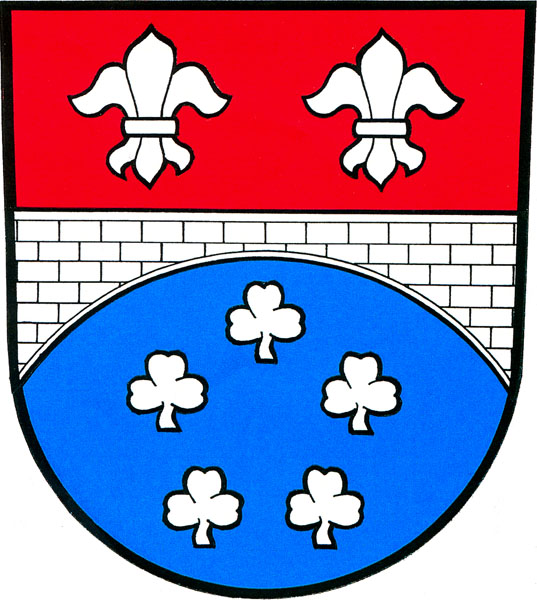
- Flag Coat of arms

- Location in the Czech Republic
- Coordinates: 49°45′22″N 15°38′53″E
- Country: Czech Republic
- Region: Vysočina
- District: Havlíčkův Brod
- Founded: 1288

Area
  - Total: 12.42 km^{2} (4.80 sq mi)
- Elevation: 404 m (1,325 ft)

Population (2026-01-01)
  - Total: 570
  - Density: 46/km^{2} (120/sq mi)
- Time zone: UTC+1 (CET)
  - Summer (DST): UTC+2 (CEST)
- Postal codes: 582 73, 583 01
- Website: www.novavesuchot.cz

Nová Ves u Chotěboře is a municipality and village in Havlíčkův Brod District in the Vysočina Region of the Czech Republic. It has about 600 inhabitants.

Nová Ves u Chotěboře lies approximately 17 kilometres (11 mi) north of Havlíčkův Brod, 40 km (25 mi) north of Jihlava, and 96 km (60 mi) south-east of Prague.

== Administrative division ==
Nová Ves u Chotěboře consists of two municipal parts (in brackets population according to the 2021 census):

- Nová Ves u Chotěboře (499)
- Nový Dvůr (41)

== History ==
Nová Ves u Chotěboře was founded in 1288 by knight Mstislav. It was originally called Fojtova Ves and later it was renamed.

== Demographics ==
Historical population
Year	Pop.	±%
1869	981	—
1880	1,085	+10.6%
1890	979	−9.8%
1900	1,011	+3.3%
1910	1,010	−0.1%
1921	1,001	−0.9%
1930	958	−4.3%
1950	736	−23.2%
1961	815	+10.7%
1970	715	−12.3%
1980	630	−11.9%
1991	576	−8.6%
2001	553	−4.0%
2011	575	+4.0%
2021	540	−6.1%
Source: Censuses
