= Kraborovice =

- Municipality
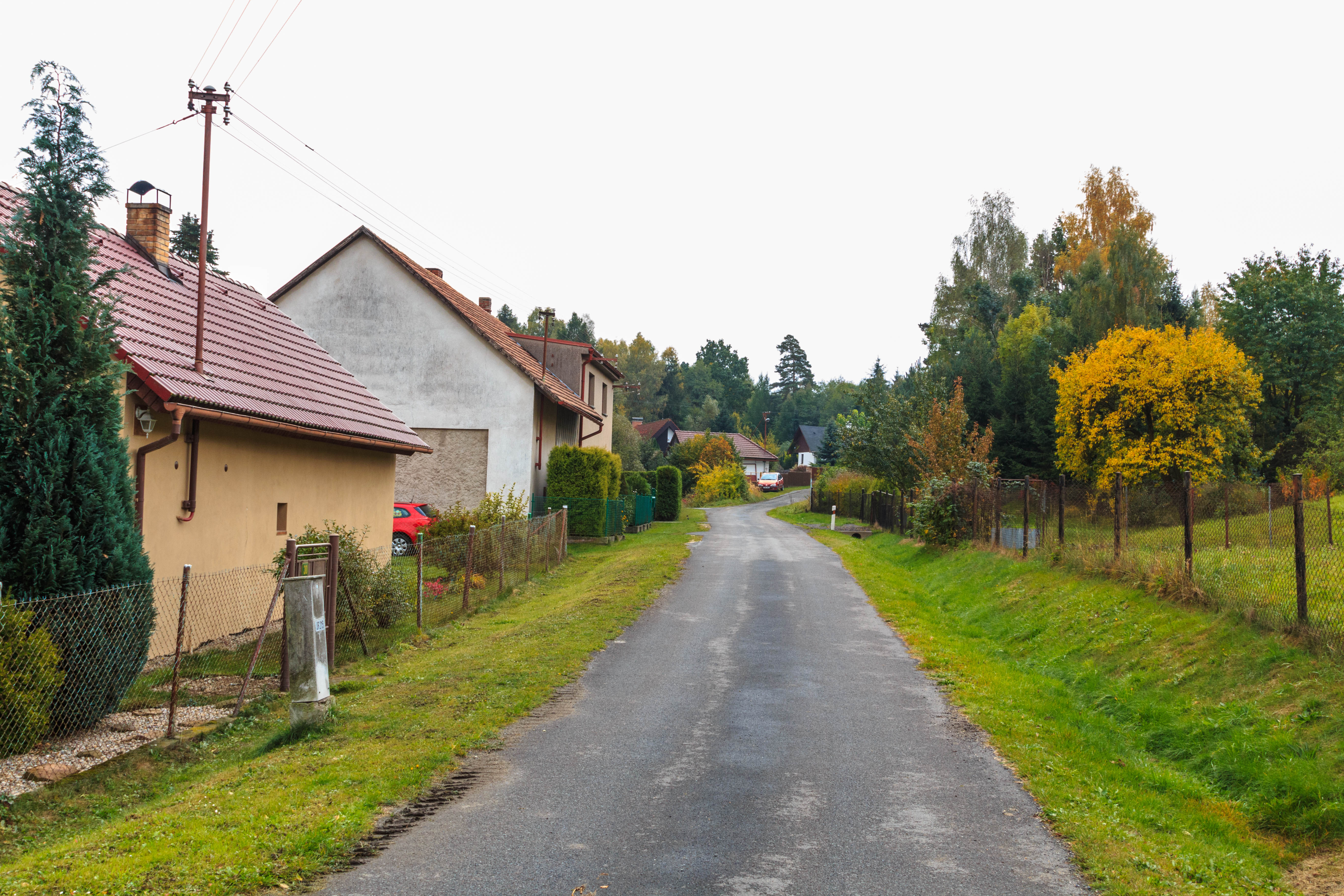
- Side street

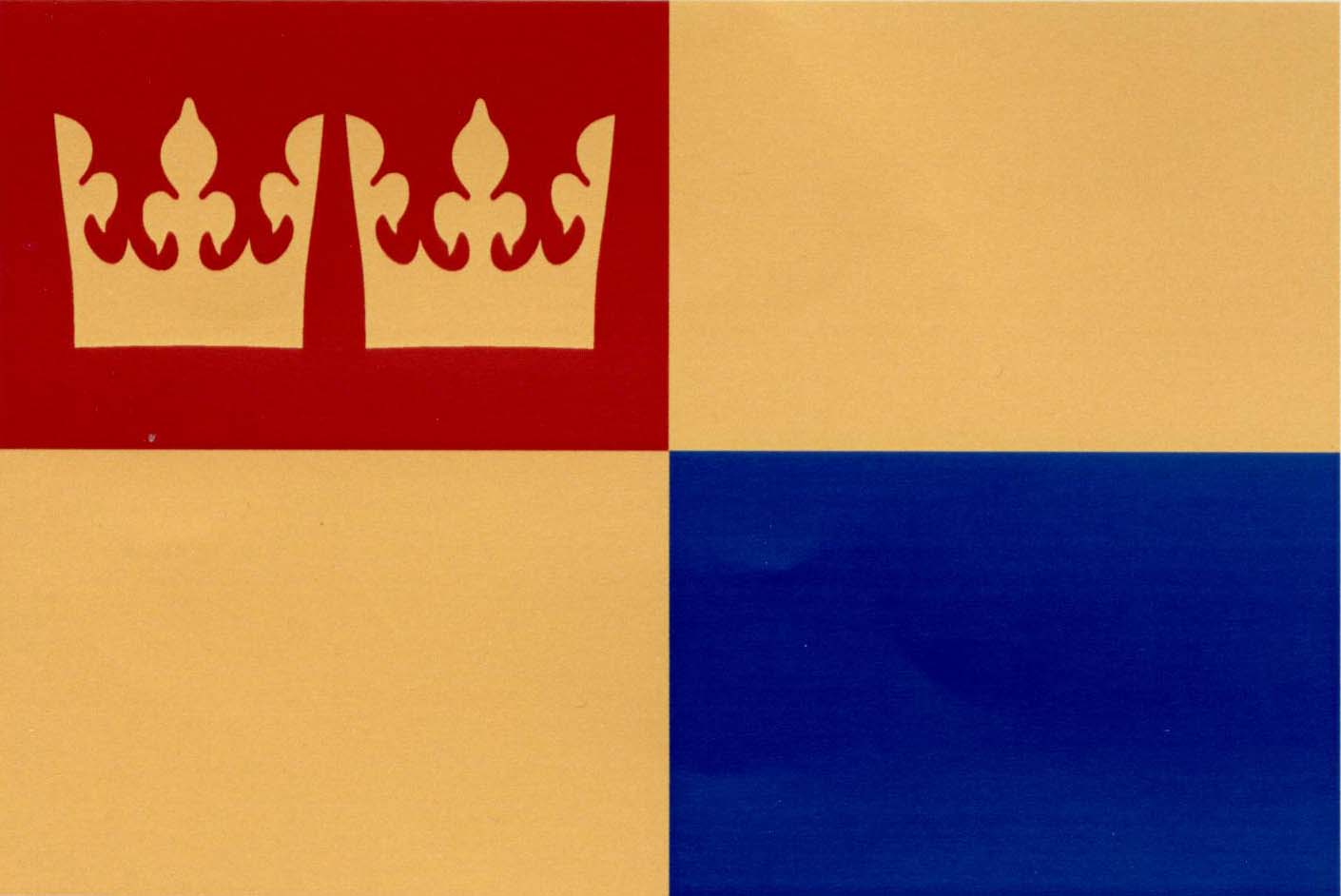
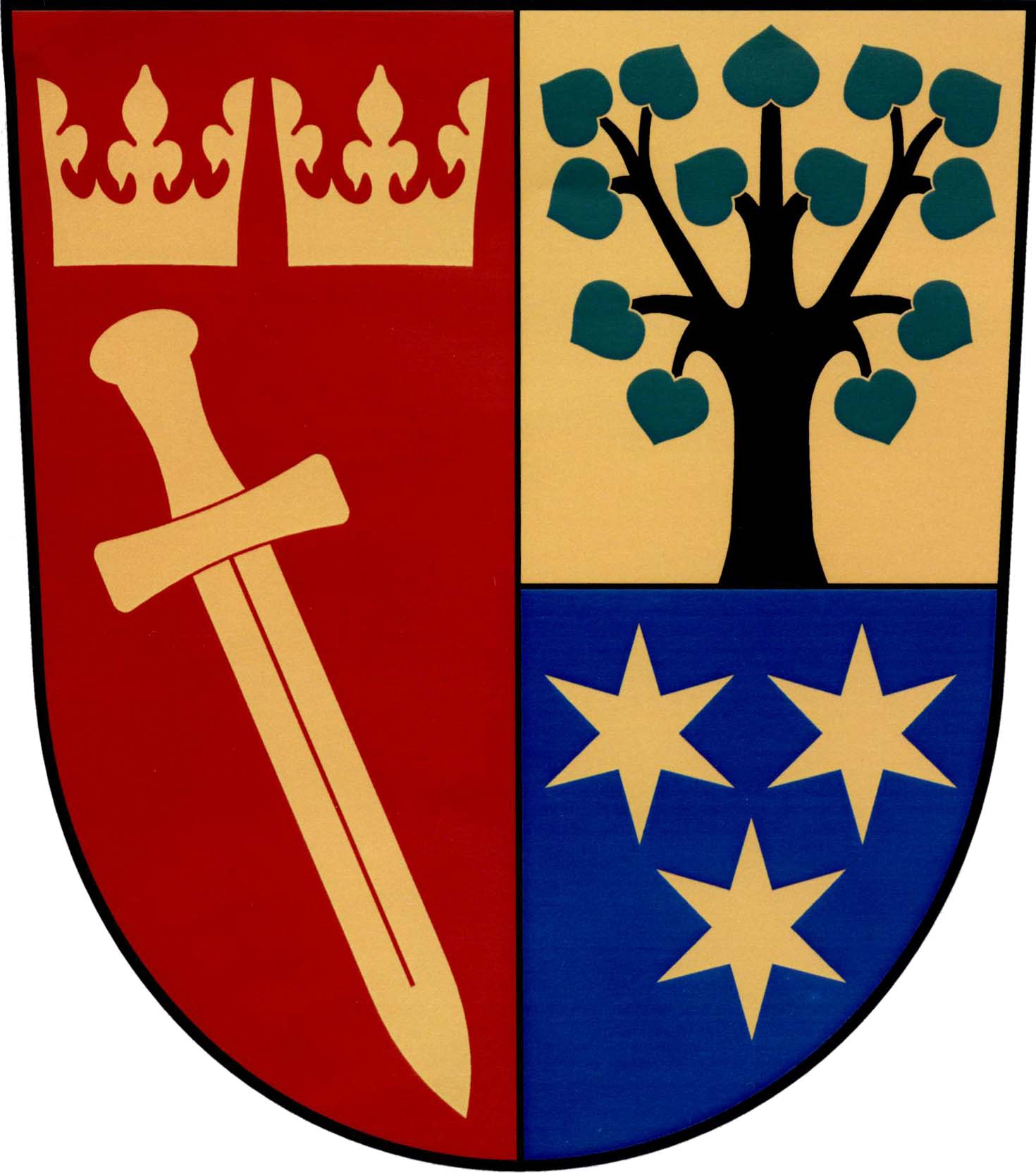
- Flag Coat of arms

- Location in the Czech Republic
- Coordinates: 49°48′2″N 15°34′19″E
- Country: Czech Republic
- Region: Vysočina
- District: Havlíčkův Brod
- First mentioned: 1556

Area
  - Total: 5.27 km^{2} (2.03 sq mi)
- Elevation: 390 m (1,280 ft)

Population (2026-01-01)
  - Total: 123
  - Density: 23.3/km^{2} (60.4/sq mi)
- Time zone: UTC+1 (CET)
  - Summer (DST): UTC+2 (CEST)
- Postal code: 582 82
- Website: www.kraborovice.eu

Kraborovice is a municipality and village in Havlíčkův Brod District in the Vysočina Region of the Czech Republic. It has about 100 inhabitants.

Kraborovice lies approximately 22 kilometres (14 mi) north of Havlíčkův Brod, 45 km (28 mi) north of Jihlava, and 89 km (55 mi) east of Prague.

== Administrative division ==
Kraborovice consists of two municipal parts (in brackets population according to the 2021 census):

- Kraborovice (51)
- Úhrov (58)

== Demographics ==
Historical population
Year	Pop.	±%
1869	547	—
1880	520	−4.9%
1890	461	−11.3%
1900	390	−15.4%
1910	407	+4.4%
1921	374	−8.1%
1930	302	−19.3%
1950	299	−1.0%
1961	300	+0.3%
1970	240	−20.0%
1980	174	−27.5%
1991	118	−32.2%
2001	102	−13.6%
2011	87	−14.7%
2021	109	+25.3%
Source: Censuses
