= Heřmanice (Havlíčkův Brod District) =

- Municipality
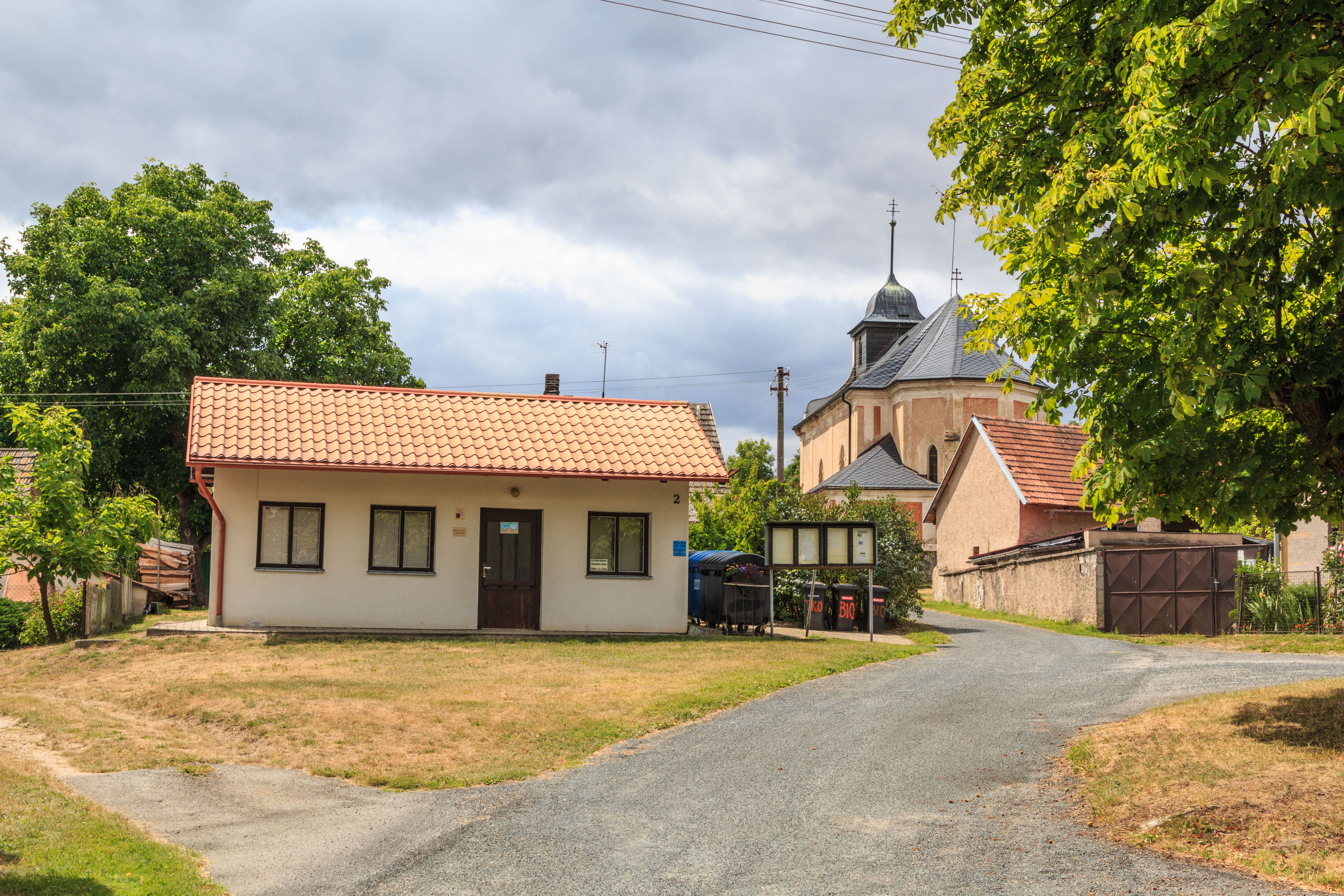
- Municipal office and Church of St. Bartholomew

- Location in the Czech Republic
- Coordinates: 49°49′26″N 15°32′50″E
- Country: Czech Republic
- Region: Vysočina
- District: Havlíčkův Brod
- First mentioned: 1281

Area
  - Total: 4.54 km^{2} (1.75 sq mi)
- Elevation: 353 m (1,158 ft)

Population (2026-01-01)
  - Total: 55
  - Density: 12/km^{2} (31/sq mi)
- Time zone: UTC+1 (CET)
  - Summer (DST): UTC+2 (CEST)
- Postal code: 582 82
- Website: www.obechermanice.cz

Heřmanice is a municipality and village in Havlíčkův Brod District in the Vysočina Region of the Czech Republic. It has about 60 inhabitants.

Heřmanice lies approximately 25 kilometres (16 mi) north of Havlíčkův Brod, 48 km (30 mi) north of Jihlava, and 87 km (54 mi) east of Prague.

== Administrative division ==
Heřmanice consists of two municipal parts (in brackets population according to the 2021 census):

- Heřmanice (37)
- Bučovice (14)

== Demographics ==
Historical population
Year	Pop.	±%
1869	268	—
1880	233	−13.1%
1890	249	+6.9%
1900	238	−4.4%
1910	256	+7.6%
1921	247	−3.5%
1930	228	−7.7%
1950	170	−25.4%
1961	153	−10.0%
1970	136	−11.1%
1980	111	−18.4%
1991	78	−29.7%
2001	69	−11.5%
2011	62	−10.1%
2021	51	−17.7%
Source: Censuses
