= William George Horner =

British school master and mathematician (1786–1837)

William George Horner (9 June 1786 – 22 September 1837) was a British mathematician. Proficient in classics and mathematics, he was a schoolmaster, headmaster and schoolkeeper who wrote extensively on functional equations, number theory and approximation theory, but also on optics. His contribution to approximation theory is honoured in the designation Horner's method, in particular respect of a paper in Philosophical Transactions of the Royal Society of London for 1819. The modern invention of the zoetrope, under the name Daedaleum in 1834, has been attributed to him.

Horner died comparatively young, before the establishment of specialist, regular scientific periodicals. So, the way others have written about him has tended to diverge, sometimes markedly, from his own prolific, if dispersed, record of publications and the contemporary reception of them.

== Family life ==
The eldest son of William Horner, a Wesleyan minister, Horner was born in Bristol. He was educated at Kingswood School, a Wesleyan foundation near Bristol, and at the age of sixteen became an assistant master there. In four years he rose to be headmaster (1806), but left in 1809, setting up his own school, The Classical Seminary, at Grosvenor Place, Bath, which he kept until he died there 22 September 1837. He and his wife Sarah (1787?–1864) had six daughters and two sons.

== Physical sciences, optics ==
Although Horner's article on the Dædalum (zoetrope) appeared in Philosophical Magazine only in January, 1834, he had published on Camera lucida as early as August, 1815.

== Mathematics ==
Horner's name first appears in the list of solvers of the mathematical problems in The Ladies' Diary: or, Woman's Almanack for 1811, continuing in the successive annual issues until that for 1817. Up until the issue for 1816, he is listed as solving all but a few of the fifteen problems each year; several of his answers were printed, along with two problems he proposed. He also contributed to other departments of the Diary, not without distinction, reflecting the fact that he was known to be an all-rounder, competent in the classics as well as in mathematics. Horner was ever vigilant in his reading, as shown by his characteristic return to the Diary for 1821 in a discussion of the Prize Problem, where he reminds readers of an item in (Thomson's) Annals of Philosophy for 1817; several other problems in the Diary that year were solved by his youngest brother, Joseph.

His record in The Gentleman's Diary: or, Mathematical Repository for this period is similar, including one of two published modes of proof in the volume for 1815 of a problem posed the previous year by Thomas Scurr (d. 1836), now dubbed the Butterfly theorem. Leaving the headmastership of Kingswood School would have given him more time for this work, while the appearance of his name in these publications, which were favoured by a network of mathematics teachers, would have helped publicize his own school.

At this stage, Horner's efforts turned more to The Mathematical Repository, edited by Thomas Leybourn, but to contributing occasional articles, rather than the problem section, as well as to Annals of Philosophy, where Horner begins by responding to other contributors and works up to independent articles of his own; he has a careful style with acknowledgements and, more often than not, cannot resist adding further detail.

Several contributions pave the way for, or are otherwise related to, his most celebrated mathematical paper, in Philosophical Transactions of the Royal Society of London in 1819, which was read by title at the closing meeting for the session on 1 July 1819, with Davies Gilbert in the Chair. The article, with significant editorial notes by Thomas Stephens Davies, was reprinted as a commemorative tribute in The Ladies' Diary for 1838. The issue of The Gentleman's Diary for that year contains a short obituary notice. A careful analysis of this paper has appeared recently in Craig Smoryński's History of Mathematics: A Supplement.

While a sequel was read before the Royal Society, publication was declined for Philosophical Transactions, having to await appearance in a sequence of parts in the first two volumes of The Mathematician in the mid-1840s, again largely at the instigation of T. S. Davies.

However, Horner published on diverse topics in The Philosophical Magazine well into the 1830s. Davies mooted an edition of Horner's collected papers, but this project never came to fruition, partly on account of Davies' own early death.

== Publications ==
- New and important combinations with the Camera Lucida, dated Bath, 15 August 1815, Annals of Philosophy, 6 (Oct. 1815), 281–283.
- I. On Annuities. - II. Imaginary cube roots. - III. Roots of Binomials, dated Bath, 9 September 1816, Annals of Philosophy, 8 (Oct. 1816), 279–284.
- Corrections of the paper inserted in the last number of the Annals, p. 279, dated Bath, 3 October 1816 Annals of Philosophy, 8 (Nov. 1816), 388–389.
- Formulas for estimating the height of mountains, dated Bath, 13 February 1817 Annals of Philosophy, 9 (March, 1817), 251–252.
- On cubic equations, dated Bath, 17 January 1817, Annals of Philosophy, 9 (May, 1817), 378–381.
- Solution of the equation ψ^{n}x=x, Annals of Philosophy, 10 (Nov, 1817), 341–346.
- On reversion of series, especially in connection with the equation ψα^{−1}ψαx=x, dated Bath, 10 November 1817, Annals of Philosophy, 11 (Feb, 1818), 108–112.
- On popular methods of approximation, dated Bath, 1819, Math. Rep. New Series, 4 (1819), Part II, 131–136.
- 'A Tribute of Friendship,’ a poem addressed to his friend Thomas Fussell, appended to a 'Funeral Sermon on Mrs. Fussell,’ Bristol, 1820.
- On algebraic transformation, as deducible from first principles, and connected with continuous approximations, and the theory of finite and fluxional differences, including some new modes of numerical solution, one of ten papers read at the table at the meeting of the Royal on 19 June 1823, immediately before the long vacation adjournment until 20 November 1823; one of the three papers of the set not published in Phil. Trans. that year; published in issues in the first two volumes of The Mathematician bound up in 1845 and 1847.
- Extension of Theorem of Fermat, dated 26 December, Annals of Philosophy New Series, 11 (Feb, 1826), 81–83.
- On the solutions of the Function ψ^{z}x and their limitations, Art 1-8, dated Bath, 11 February 1826, Annals of Philosophy New Series, 11 (March, 1826), 168–183; Art 9-17, ibid, 11 (April, 1826), 241–246.
- Reply to Mr. Herapath, dated Bath, 2 April 1826, Annals of Philosophy New Series, 11 (May, 1826), 363
- On the use of continued fractions with unrestricted numerators in summation of series, Art 1-4, dated Bath, 24 April 1826, Annals of Philosophy New Series, 11 (June, 1826), 416–421; Art 5-6, ibid, 12 (July, 1826), 48–51.
- 'Natural Magic,’ a pamphlet on optics dealing with virtual images, London, 1832.
- On the properties of the Dædaleum, a new instrument of optical illusion, Phil. Mag., Ser. 3, 4 (Jan, 1834), 36-41.

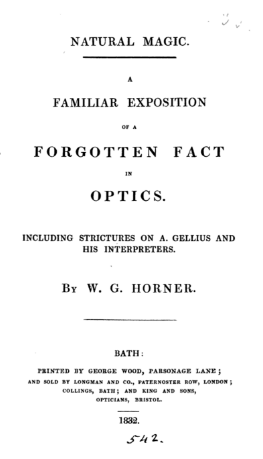
Frontpage of Horner's 1832 pamphlet on optics

- On the autoptic spectrum of certain vessels within the eye, as delineated in shadow on the retina, Phil. Mag., Ser. 3, 4 (April, 1834), 262-271.
- Considerations relative to an interesting case in equations, Phil. Mag., Ser. 3, 5 (Sept, 1834), 188-191.
- On the signs of the trigonometrical lines, Phil. Mag., Ser. 3, 6 (Feb, 1836), 86-90.
- On the theory of congeneric surd equations, Communicated by T. S. Davies, Phil. Mag., Ser. 3, 8 (Jan, 1836), 43-50.
- New demonstration of an original proposition in the theory of numbers, Communicated by T. R. Phillips, Phil. Mag., Ser. 3, 11 (Nov, 1837), 456-459.
- 'Questions for the Examination of Pupils on … General History,’ Bath, 1843, 12mo.

A complete edition of Horner's works was promised by Thomas Stephens Davies, but never appeared.

== Other contemporary literature ==
- P. Barlow, On the resolution of the irreducible case in cubic equations, Math. Rep., NS IV (1814), 46-57 [includes Table for the solution of the irreducible case in cubic equations (6pp.)].
- P. Barlow, A new method of approximating towards the roots of equations of all dimensions, Math. Rep., NS IV (1814), No. 12, 67–71.
- T. Holdred, A New Method of Solving Equations with Ease and Expedition; by which the True Value of the Unknown Quantity is Found Without Previous Reduction. With a Supplement, Containing Two Other Methods of Solving Equations, Derived from the Same Principle(Richard Watts. Sold by Davis and Dickson, mathematical and philosophical booksellers, 17, St. Martin's-le-Grand; and by the author, 2, Denzel Street, Clare-Market, 1820), 56pp..
