= Anthony Nesbit =

English schoolmaster and land surveyor

- Born: 1778
- Died: 15 March 1859 (aged 80–81)
- Occupations: Schoolmaster and land surveyor

Anthony Nesbit (1778 – 15 March 1859) was an English schoolmaster and land surveyor.

== Biography ==
He was the son of Jacob Nesbit, a farmer of Long Benton, near Newcastle upon Tyne, where he was baptised on 3 May 1778.

Nesbit's own account, in the preface to his Arithmetic, states that he was educated "under the direction of some of the first commercial and mathematical preceptors in the kingdom", and that, having a vocation for teaching, he became a schoolmaster at an early age. In the Old Yorkshire of the local historian William Smith (1832–1907), however, an account of his early life states that he worked as a navvy. Thomas Watts of Hovingham met him in a bookshop at Malton, Yorkshire, in work clothes, asking for a mathematical text, and Watts befriended him.

Nesbit lived successively at Whitby, Malton, Scarborough, Bridlington and Hull. In 1808–9 he was an under-master at Preston Grammar School, as appears from a communication to the Lady's Diary for 1809. In 1810 he describes himself on the title-page of his Land Surveying as "land surveyor and teacher of the mathematics" at Farnley, Leeds. About 1814 Nesbit set up a school in Bradford. He moved on c.1821 to Manchester, where his school in Oxford Road became well known

Later, around 1841, Nesbit moved to London, and started a school at 38 Lower Kennington Lane, at that time in Surrey. Richard Bissell Prosser, author of Nesbit's life in the Dictionary of National Biography, was according to the modern Oxford Dictionary of National Biography likely a pupil at his son John's associated school in 1845, advertised under the name "Scientific Academy and Agricultural Training School".

Anthony Nesbit died in Kennington Lane on 15 March 1859, and was buried in Norwood Cemetery.

== Works ==
Nesbit's books, which had a considerable reputation in their day, especially in the North of England, are:

- Land Surveying, York, 1810.
- Mensuration, 1816.
- English Parsing, 1817.
- Practical Gauging, York, 1822.
- Arithmetic, Liverpool, 1826; second part, London, 1846.
- An Essay on Education, London, 1841.

Some of Nesbit's books went through several editions, and his Land Surveying was revised by successive editors, a twelfth edition appearing in 1870. He contributed to the mathematical portions of the Lady's Diary, Enquirer and Leeds Correspondent.

== Family ==
Nesbit married in 1817 Mary Collis, daughter of the late Rev. David Collis, in 1780 a warden of the Fulneck Moravian Church, later at Fairfield Moravian Church, and his wife Anna Planta. The couple had five children. The son John Collis Nesbit was the father of the author E. Nesbit. He and another son, Edward Planta Nesbit, participated in the writing of An Essay on Education. Edward Planta Nesbit emigrated to Australia and was father of Paris Nesbit.
