= Newcomen atmospheric engine =

Early steam engine invented by Thomas Newcomen

Schematic Newcomen engine. – Steam (pink), water (blue) – Valves open (green), valves closed (red)

The atmospheric engine was invented by Thomas Newcomen in 1712, and is sometimes referred to as the Newcomen fire engine (see below) or Newcomen engine. The engine was operated by condensing steam being drawn into the cylinder, thereby creating a partial vacuum which allowed atmospheric pressure to push the piston into the cylinder. It is significant as the first practical device to harness steam to produce mechanical work. Newcomen engines were used throughout Britain and Europe, principally to pump water out of mines. Hundreds were constructed during the 18th century. James Watt's later engine design was an improved version of the Newcomen engine that roughly doubled fuel efficiency. Many atmospheric engines were converted to the Watt design. As a result, Watt is today better known than Newcomen in relation to the origin of the steam engine.

== Precursors ==
Prior to Newcomen, a number of small steam devices of various sorts had been made, but most were essentially novelties. Around 1600, a number of experimenters used steam to power small fountains working like a coffee percolator. First, a container was filled with water via a pipe, which extended through the top of the container to nearly the bottom. The bottom of the pipe would be submerged in the water, making the container airtight. The container was then heated to make the water boil. The steam generated pressurized the container, but the inner pipe, immersed at the bottom by liquid, and lacking an airtight seal at top, remained at a lower pressure; expanding steam forced the water at the bottom of the container into and up the pipe to spurt out of a nozzle on top. These devices had limited effectiveness but illustrated the principle's viability.

In 1606, the Spaniard, Jerónimo de Ayanz y Beaumont, demonstrated and was granted a patent for a steam-powered water pump. The pump was successfully used to drain the inundated mines of Guadalcanal, Spain.

In 1662, Edward Somerset, 2nd Marquess of Worcester, published a book containing several ideas he had been working on. One was for a steam-powered pump to supply water to fountains; the device alternately used a partial vacuum and steam pressure. Two containers were alternately filled with steam, then sprayed with cold water making the steam within condense; this produced a partial vacuum that would draw water through a pipe up from a well to the container. A fresh charge of steam under pressure then drove the water from the container up another pipe to a higher-level header before that steam condensed and the cycle repeated. By working the two containers alternately, the delivery rate to the header tank could be increased.

=== Savery's "Miner's Friend" ===
In 1698, Thomas Savery patented a steam-powered pump he called the "Miner's Friend", combining both the expansive power of steam and the vacuum formed through condensation. The process of cooling and creating the vacuum was fairly slow, so Savery later added an external cold water spray to quickly cool the steam.

Savery's invention cannot be strictly regarded as the first steam "engine" since it had no moving parts and could not transmit its power to any external device. There were evidently high hopes for the Miner's Friend, which led Parliament to extend the life of the patent by 21 years, so that the 1699 patent would not expire until 1733. Unfortunately, Savery's device proved much less successful than had been hoped.

A theoretical problem with Savery's device stemmed from the fact that a vacuum could only raise water to a maximum height of about 30 ft (9 m); to this could be added another 40 ft (12 m), or so, raised by steam pressure. This was insufficient to pump water out of a mine. In Savery's pamphlet, he suggests setting the boiler and containers on a ledge in the mineshaft and even a series of two or more pumps for deeper levels. Obviously, these were inconvenient solutions and some sort of mechanical pump working at surface level – one that lifted the water directly instead of "sucking" it up – was desirable. Such pumps were common already, powered by horses, but required a vertical reciprocating drive that Savery's system did not provide. The more practical problem concerned having a boiler operating under pressure, as demonstrated when the boiler of an engine at Wednesbury exploded, perhaps in 1705. Engines based on the Savery design, albeit enhanced over time, were installed and used as returning engines, raising water to boost the supply to existing water wheels; examples are known in Manchester and Lancashire.

=== Denis Papin's experimental steam cylinder and piston ===
Louis Figuier in his monumental work gives a full quotation of Denis Papin's paper published in 1690 in Acta eruditorum at Leipzig, entitled "Nouvelle méthode pour obtenir à bas prix des forces considérables" (A new method for cheaply obtaining considerable forces). It seems that the idea came to Papin while working with Robert Boyle at the Royal Society in London. Papin describes first pouring a small quantity of water into the bottom of a vertical cylinder, inserting a piston on a rod and after first evacuating the air below the piston, placing a fire beneath the cylinder to boil the water away and create enough steam pressure to raise the piston to the top end of the cylinder. The piston was then temporarily locked in the upper position by a spring catch engaging a notch in the rod. The fire was then removed, allowing the cylinder to cool, which condensed steam back into water, thus creating a vacuum beneath the piston. To the end of the piston rod was attached a cord passing over two pulleys and a weight hung down from the cord's end. Upon releasing the catch, the piston was sharply drawn down to the bottom of the cylinder by the pressure differential between the atmosphere and the created vacuum; enough force was thus generated to raise a 60 lb (27 kg) weight. "Several of his papers were put before the Royal Society between 1707 and 1712 [including] a description of his 1690 atmospheric steam engine, similar to that built and [subsequently] put into use by Thomas Newcomen in 1712."

== Introduction and spread ==
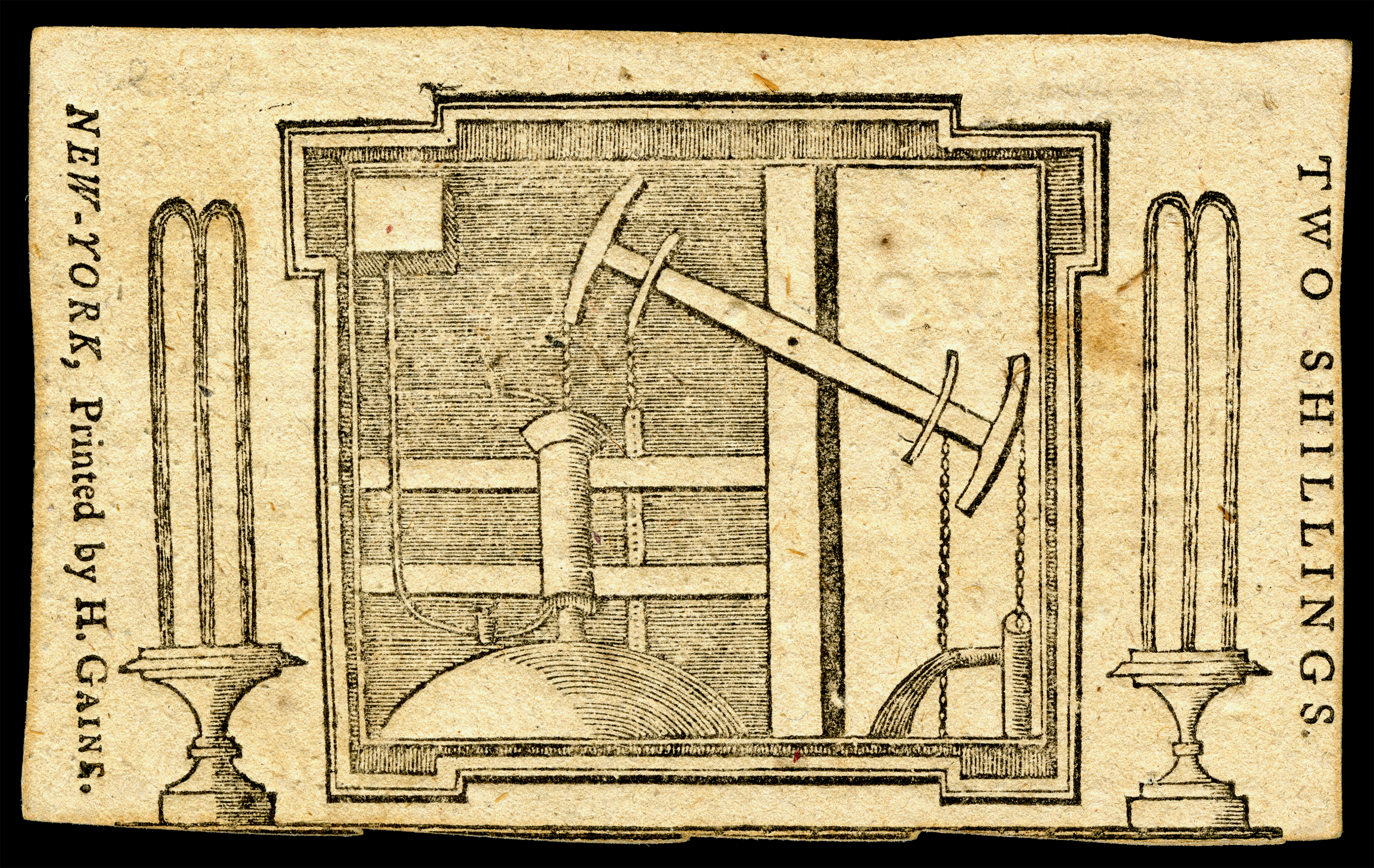
Newcomen engine as depicted on a 2/- note of the Province of New York, 1775

Newcomen took forward Papin's experiment and made it workable, although little information exists as to exactly how this came about. (Note: In The Invention of Science: A New History of the Scientific Revolution, by David Wootton, the author proposes that the actual source used by Newcomen was Papin's brochure "A New Digester or Engine for Softening Bones.") The main problem to which Papin had given no solution was how to make the action repeatable at regular intervals. The way forward was to provide, as Savery had, a boiler capable of ensuring the continuity of the supply of steam to the cylinder, providing the vacuum power stroke by condensing the steam, and disposing of the water once it had been condensed. The power piston was hung by chains from the end of a rocking beam. Unlike Savery's device, pumping was entirely mechanical, the work of the steam engine being to lift a weighted rod slung from the opposite extremity of the rocking beam. The rod descended the mine shaft by gravity and drove a force pump, or pole pump (or most often a gang of two) inside the mineshaft. The suction stroke of the pump was only for the length of the upward (priming) stroke, there consequently was no longer the 30-foot restriction of a vacuum pump and water could be forced up a column from far greater depths. The boiler supplied the steam at extremely low pressure and was at first located immediately beneath the power cylinder but could also be placed behind a separating wall with a connecting steam pipe. Making all this work needed the skill of a practical engineer; Newcomen's trade as an "ironmonger" or metal merchant would have given him significant practical knowledge of what materials would be suitable for such an engine and brought him into contact with people having even more detailed knowledge.

The earliest examples for which reliable records exist were two engines in the Black Country, of which the more famous was that erected in 1712 at the Conygree Coalworks in Bloomfield Road Tipton now the site of "The Angle Ring Company Limited", Tipton. This is generally accepted as the first successful Newcomen engine and followed by one built a mile and a half east of Wolverhampton. Both these were used by Newcomen and his partner John Calley to pump out water-filled coal mines. A working replica can today be seen at the nearby Black Country Living Museum, which stands on another part of what was Lord Dudley's Conygree Park. Another Newcomen engine was in Cornwall. Its location is uncertain, but it is known that one was in operation at Wheal Vor mine in 1715. Soon orders from wet mines all over England were coming in, and some have suggested that word of his achievement was spread through his Baptist connections. Since Savery's patent had not yet run out, Newcomen was forced to come to an arrangement with Savery and operate under the latter's patent, as its term was much longer than any Newcomen could have easily obtained. During the latter years of its currency, the patent belonged to an unincorporated company, The Proprietors of the Invention for raising water by fire.

Although its first use was in coal-mining areas, Newcomen's engine was also used for pumping water out of the metal mines in his native West Country, such as the tin mines of Cornwall. In 1742, Abraham Darby II used a Newcomen engine to pump water back up through his pools to reuse on the waterwheels. In 1748, William Champion bought Newcomen engines to raise the water 18ft from the waterwheels back to the 13 acre lake.

By the time of his death, Newcomen and others had installed over a hundred of his engines, not only in the West Country and the Midlands but also in north Wales, near Newcastle and in Cumbria. Small numbers were built in other European countries, including in France, Belgium, Spain, and Hungary, also at Dannemora, Sweden. Evidence of the use of a Newcomen Steam Engine associated with early coal mines was found in 2010 in Midlothian, VA (site of some of the first coal mines in the US). (Dutton and Associates survey dated 24 November 2009).

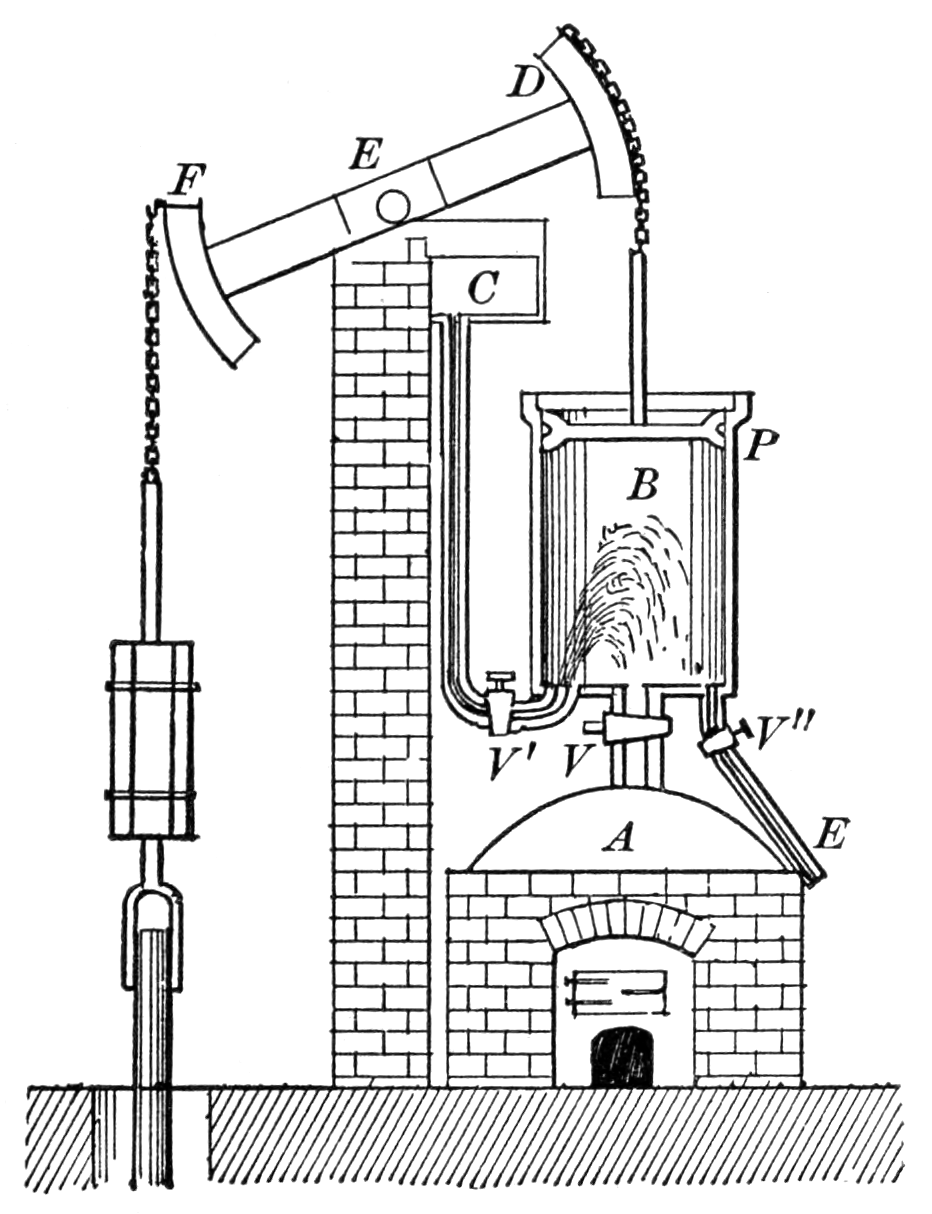
Diagram of the Newcomen steam engine

== Technical details ==
=== Components ===
Although based on simple principles, Newcomen's engine was rather complex and showed signs of incremental development, problems being empirically addressed as they arose. It consisted of a boiler A, usually a haystack boiler, situated directly below the cylinder. This produced large quantities of very low pressure steam, no more than 1–2 psi (0.07–0.14 bar) – the maximum allowable pressure for a boiler that in earlier versions was made of copper with a domed top of lead and later entirely assembled from small riveted iron plates. The action of the engine was transmitted through a rocking "Great balanced Beam", the fulcrum E of which rested on the very solid end-gable wall of the purpose-built engine house with the pump side projecting outside of the building, the engine being located in-house. The pump rods were slung by a chain from the arch-head F of the great beam. From the in-house arch-head D was suspended a piston P working in a cylinder B, the top end of which was open to the atmosphere above the piston and the bottom end closed, apart from the short admission pipe connecting the cylinder to the boiler.

Early cylinders were made of cast brass, but cast iron was soon found more effective and much cheaper to produce. The first to use cast iron was reported to be the engine installed at Hawarden in Wales between 1714 and 1715. Among the foundries producing and boring iron Newcomen engine cylinders were Coalbrookdale and later the Carron ironworks. The piston was initially surrounded by a seal in the form of a leather ring, but as the cylinder bore was finished by hand and not absolutely true, a layer of water had to be constantly maintained on top of the piston. Later soft hemp rope packing was used with iron weights above to keep it in place. The piston was insulated from the steam, which it would otherwise condense, by bolting wood to the underside. Installed high up in the engine house was a water tank C (or header tank) fed by a small in-house pump slung from a smaller arch-head. The header tank supplied cold water under pressure via a stand-pipe for condensing the steam in the cylinder with a small branch supplying the cylinder-sealing water; at each top stroke of the piston excess warm sealing water overflowed down two pipes, one to the in-house well and the other to feed the boiler by gravity.

=== Operation ===
The pump equipment was heavier than the steam piston, so that the position of the beam at rest was pump-side down/engine-side up, which was called "out of the house".

To start the engine, the regulator valve V was opened and steam admitted into the cylinder from the boiler, filling the space beneath the piston. The regulator valve was then closed and the water injection valve V' briefly snapped open and shut, sending a spray of cold water into the cylinder. This condensed the steam and created a partial vacuum under the piston. Pressure differential between the atmosphere above the piston and the partial vacuum below then drove the piston down making the power stroke, bringing the beam "into the house", raising the pump gear and pumping the water up from the mine.

Steam was then readmitted to the cylinder, destroying the vacuum and driving the condensate down the sinking or "eduction" pipe. As the low pressure steam from the boiler flowed into the cylinder, the weight of the pump and gear returned the beam to its initial position.

This cycle was repeated around 12 times per minute.

==== Snifting valve ====
Newcomen found that his first engine would stop working after a while, and eventually discovered that this was due to small amounts of air being admitted to the cylinder with the steam. Water usually contains some dissolved air, and boiling the water released this with the steam. This air could not be condensed by the water spray and gradually accumulated until the engine became "wind logged". To prevent this, a release valve called a "snifting clack" or snifter valve was included near the bottom of the cylinder. This opened briefly when steam was first introduced, and non-condensable gas was driven from the cylinder. Its name was derived from the noise it made when it operated to release the air and steam "like a Man snifting with a Cold".

=== Automation ===
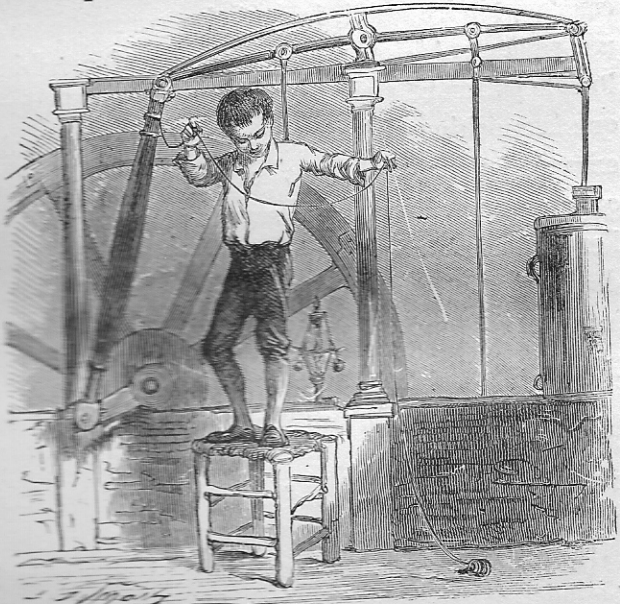
Humphry Potter tying his strings.

In early versions, the valves or plugs as they were then called, were operated manually by the plug man but the repetitive action demanded precise timing, making automatic action desirable. This was obtained by means of a plug tree which was a beam suspended vertically alongside the cylinder from a small arch head by crossed chains, its function being to open and close the valves automatically when the beam reached certain positions, by means of tappets and escapement mechanisms using weights. On the 1712 engine, the water feed pump was attached to the bottom of the plug tree, but later engines had the pump outside suspended from a separate small arch-head. There is a common legend that in 1713 a cock boy named Humphrey Potter, whose duty it was to open and shut the valves of an engine he attended, made the engine self-acting by causing the beam itself to open and close the valves by suitable cords and catches (known as the "potter cord"); however the plug tree device (the first form of valve gear) was very likely established practice before 1715, and is clearly depicted in the earliest known images of Newcomen engines by Henry Beighton (1717) (believed by Hulse to depict the 1714 Griff colliery engine) and by Thomas Barney (1719) (depicting the 1712 Dudley Castle engine). Because of the very heavy steam demands, the engine had to be periodically stopped and restarted, but even this process was automated by means of a buoy rising and falling in a vertical stand pipe fixed to the boiler. The buoy was attached to the scoggen, a weighted lever that worked a stop blocking the water injection valve shut until more steam had been raised.

=== Pumps ===
The design of pumps used for coal mines with Newcomen engines are discussed in some detail in John Farey's book "A treatise on the steam engine", published in 1827. Water is rarely raised to the surface, but instead is pumped from the base of the shaft to an adit level which is a slowly descending shaft driven to a suitable low point to discharge the water. At the base of the shaft the pump draws water into the base section by suction (the pump is called a sucking pump as a result), and thence above a non-return valve into the main pump body. The pump piston incorporates a valve which opens on the downstroke and then closes lifting the column of water above into a column made of iron pipes joined with lead gaskets. The normal maximum lift is 50 yards due to the water pressure in the iron pipes, which have to be strong enough to withstand the pressure and a degree of shock. The pump rod may be divided to operate multiple pumps to overcome this limitation, each one lifting water into a cistern which feeds into the pump above. One particular consideration is to make sure the pumps do not draw in air as the resulting shocks can damage the pump system and the engine.

== Development and application ==
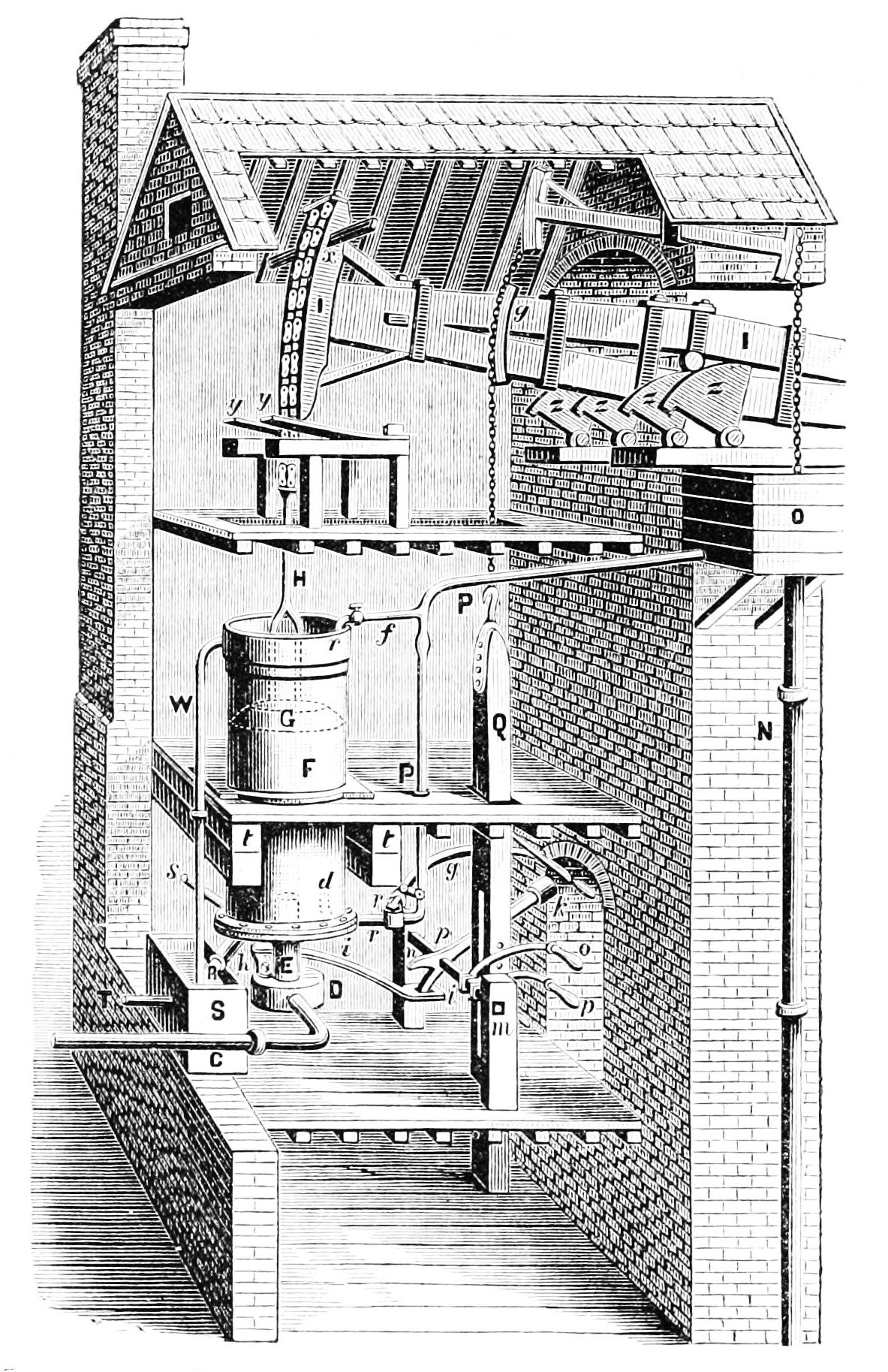
Pencil sketch of Newcomen steam engine as improved by Smeaton, from Popular Science monthly circa 1877

Towards the close of its career, the atmospheric engine was much improved in its mechanical details and its proportions by John Smeaton, who built many large engines of this type during the 1770s. The urgent need for an engine to give rotary motion was making itself felt and this was done with limited success by Wasborough and Pickard using a Newcomen engine to drive a flywheel through a crank. Although the principle of the crank had long been known, Pickard managed to obtain a 12-year patent in 1780 for the specific application of the crank to steam engines; this was a setback to Boulton and Watt who bypassed the patent by applying the sun and planet motion to their advanced double-acting rotative engine of 1782.

By 1725 the Newcomen engine was in common use in mining, particularly collieries. It held its place with little material change for the rest of the century. Use of the Newcomen engine was extended in some places to pump municipal water supply; for instance the first Newcomen engine in France was built at Passy in 1726 to pump water from the Seine to the city of Paris. It was also used to power machinery indirectly, by returning water from below a water wheel to a reservoir above it, so that the same water could again turn the wheel. Among the earliest examples of this was at Coalbrookdale. A horse-powered pump had been installed in 1735 to return water to the pool above the Old Blast Furnace. This was replaced by a Newcomen engine in 1742–3. Several new furnaces built in Shropshire in the 1750s were powered in a similar way, including Horsehay and Ketley Furnaces and Madeley Wood or Bedlam Furnaces. The latter does not seem to have had a pool above the furnace, merely a tank into which the water was pumped. In other industries, engine-pumping was less common, but Richard Arkwright used an engine to provide additional power for his cotton mill.

Attempts were made to drive machinery by Newcomen engines, but the engines weren't well suited to this work as the delay between power strokes produced a very jerky motion. There were attempts to smooth the motion by making Newcomen engines with two cylinders which acted on the crank alternately, the two main firms offering these being Francis Thompson of Ashover, Derbyshire (who patented the idea in 1793), and Batemen and Sherratt of Manchester.

== Successor ==
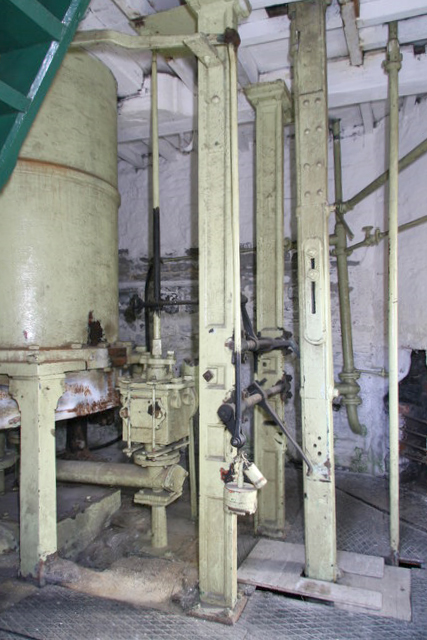
Newcomen-style engine at the Elsecar Heritage Centre in Barnsley, South Yorkshire

The main problem with the Newcomen design was that it used energy inefficiently, and was therefore expensive to operate. After the water vapor within was cooled enough to create the vacuum, the cylinder walls were cold enough to condense some of the steam as it was admitted during the next intake stroke. This meant that a considerable amount of fuel was being used just to heat the cylinder back to the point where the steam would start to fill it again. As the heat losses were related to the surfaces, while useful work related to the volume, increases in the size of the engine increased efficiency, and Newcomen engines became larger in time. However, efficiency did not matter very much within the context of a colliery, where coal was freely available.

Newcomen's engine was only replaced when James Watt improved it in 1769 to avoid this problem (Watt had been asked to repair a model of a Newcomen engine by Glasgow University—a small model that exaggerated the problem). In the Watt steam engine, condensation took place in an exterior condenser unit, attached to the steam cylinder via a pipe. When a valve on the pipe was opened, the vacuum in the condenser would, in turn, evacuate that part of the cylinder below the piston. This eliminated the cooling of the main cylinder walls and such, and dramatically reduced fuel use. It also enabled the development of a double-acting cylinder, with both upwards and downwards power strokes, increasing amount of power from the engine without a great increase in the size of the engine.

Watt's prototype engine in 1769, revealed that he needed a step-change in precision for the cylinders. In the Newcomen engine the seal could be effected with copious amounts of water, but Watt's cylinder had to operate without the water flood as the idea was to maintain the cylinder at steam temperature. Watt could not make his engines until 1774, when John Wilkinson devised an accurate cylinder boring method, and was given an exclusive contract for producing the cylinders as a result. In 1776 Watt wrote to Smeaton that "Mr Wilkinson has improved the art of boring cylinders; so that I promise upon a 72 inch cylinder being not further distant from absolute truth, than the thickness of a slim sixpence in the worst part". Boulton and Watt production started the very next year, but the new engines did not eliminate Newcomen engines. Watt's vigorous defence of his patents resulted in the continued use of the Newcomen engine in an effort to avoid royalty payments. Boulton and Watt relied on others to make the engine parts (e.g. John Wilkinson) until 1795 and this resulted in delays, plus they favoured a contract with ongoing payments based on the amount of coal saved. Competitors such as Bateman (from 1791 Bateman and Sherratt) had their own foundry in Salford and built many atmospheric engines, many breaching Watt's patent, leading to a court case in 1796 and a substantial settlement, but Boulton & Watt refused to let them licence the separate condenser. However Bateman and Sherratt, and others, continued to sell atmospheric engines, some designed to use the separate condenser when the Watt patent expired. When the patents expired in 1800, there was a rush to use the separate condenser and so the remaining Newcomen engines were adapted or replaced, even in collieries. However the use of atmospheric engines, albeit with the Watt separate condenser, was to continue for many years as the use of high-pressure steam boilers was in its early stages, and as yet unproven.

== Surviving examples ==
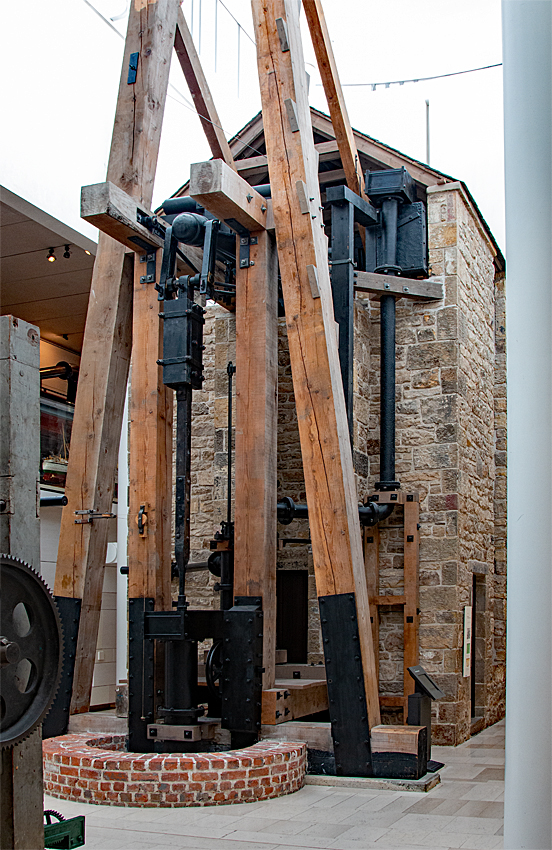
Caprington Colliery Newcomen engine in the National Museum of Scotland in Edinburgh

The Newcomen Memorial Engine can be seen operating in Newcomen's home town of Dartmouth, where it was moved in 1963 by the Newcomen Society. This is believed to date from 1725, when it was initially installed at the Griff Colliery near Coventry.

An engine was installed at a colliery in Ashton-under-Lyne in about 1760. Known locally as Fairbottom Bobs it is now preserved at the Henry Ford Museum in Dearborn, Michigan.

The only Newcomen-style engine still extant in its original location is at what is now the Elsecar Heritage Centre, near Barnsley in South Yorkshire. This was probably the last commercially used Newcomen-style engine, as it ran from 1795 until 1923. The engine underwent extensive conservation works, together with its original shaft and engine-house, which were completed in autumn 2014.

There are two static examples of a Newcomen Engine. One is in the Science Museum, London. A second example is in the National Museum of Scotland. Formerly at Caprington Colliery at Kilmarnock.

Another example, originally used at Farme Colliery is on display at Summerlee, Museum of Scottish Industrial Life; unusually it was used for winding rather than water pumping, and had been in operation for almost a century when examined in situ in 1902.

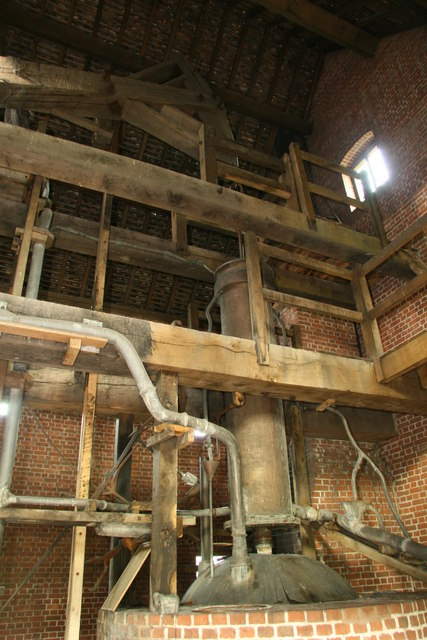
A working replica of a Newcomen engine at the Black Country Living Museum

In 1986, a full-scale operational replica of the 1712 Newcomen Steam Engine was completed at the Black Country Living Museum in Dudley. It is the only full-size working replica of the engine in existence and is believed to be a couple of miles away from the site of the first completed engine, erected in 1712. The 'fire engine' as it was known, is an impressive brick building from which a wooden beam projects through one wall. Rods hang from the outer end of the beam and operate pumps at the bottom of the mine shaft which raise the water to the surface. The engine itself is simple, with only a boiler, a cylinder and piston and operating valves. A coal fire heats the water in the boiler which is little more than a covered pan and the steam generated then passes through a valve into the brass cylinder above the boiler. The cylinder is more than 2 metres long and 52 centimetres in diameter. The steam in the cylinder is condensed by injecting cold water and the vacuum beneath the piston pulls the inner end of the beam down and causes the pump to move.

== See also ==
- Timeline of steam power
- Cataract – the speed governing device used on beam engines
- Atmospheric railway
