= William Marrat =

English printer and educator

William Marrat (1772–1852) was an English printer, publisher and educator, known as a mathematician and antiquarian.

== Life ==
Born at Sibsey, Lincolnshire, on 6 April 1772, Marrat was self-taught through wide reading and study of modern language. While at Boston, Lincolnshire, he for some years worked as a printer and publisher. In 1811–12 he, in conjunction with Pishey Thompson, ran The Enquirer, or Literary, Mathematical, and Philosophical Repository, Boston.

At other times Marrat was a teacher of mathematics, in Lincolnshire and elsewhere. He lived in New York City from 1817 to 1820, and edited there The Scientific Journal (imprint "Perth Amboy, N. J. and New York", 1818, nine numbers). He returned to England, and at Liverpool, where he settled in 1821. George Boole taught at his school, in 1833.

From 1833 to 1836 Marrat was mathematical tutor in a school at Exeter, but on the death of his wife he returned to Liverpool. He died suddenly there on 26 March 1852, and was buried at the necropolis near that city.

== Works ==
Marrat was for fifty years a contributor to mathematical serials, including The Ladies' Diary and The Gentlemen's Diary, The Receptacle, The Student, and the Leeds Correspondent. His first book was An Introduction to the Theory and Practice of Mechanics, Boston, 1810, pp. 468. During 1814–16 he wrote The History of Lincolnshire, which came out in parts, and after three volumes had been published, it was stopped: Marrat alleged this was a consequence of Sir Joseph Banks's refusal to allow access to his papers. In 1816 his Historical Description of Stamford was published at Lincoln.

An anonymous Geometrical System of Conic Sections, Cambridge, 1822, was ascribed to Marrat in the catalogue of the Liverpool Free Library. He compiled Lunar Tables, Liverpool, 1823, and wrote The Elements of Mechanical Philosophy, 1825. At this period he compiled the Liverpool Tide Table, and was a contributor to Blackwood's Magazine.

== Family ==
His son Frederick Price Marrat was known as a conchologist.

== Notes ==
Attribution

- This article incorporates text from a publication now in the public domain: Lee, Sidney, ed. (1893). "Marrat, William". Dictionary of National Biography. Vol. 36. London: Smith, Elder & Co.
