= John Tipper =

John Tipper may refer to

- John Tipper (mathematician) (1616–1713), English mathematician
- John Tipper (speed skater) (born 1944), English Olympic speedskater
