= John Tipper (mathematician) =

English mathematician

John Tipper (1663–1713) was an English mathematician and almanac-maker, now known as the founder of The Ladies' Diary, in which some important mathematical results were first published.

== Life ==
He was born at Coventry. In 1699 he was elected master of Bablake School in that city in the place of Richard Butler. It is thought that he founded it to promote Bablake School in Coventry where he was master and to make some money but he also thought it important to promote women who he saw as being unfairly treated by society. In 1704 he commenced an almanac and a serial collection of mathematical papers, under the title of The Ladies' Diary, which he continued to edit until his death. It was carried on until 1840, when it was united with the Gentleman's Diary, under the title The Lady's and Gentleman's Diary, and continued to appear until 1871. In 1710 he also founded Great Britain's Diary, which continued to be issued until 1728. Tipper was a mathematician of some ability, and to the typical contents of astrological almanacs he added mathematical problems of a difficult nature which his readers were invited to solve. Among those who exercised their ingenuity in attempting these was Thomas Simpson, the well-known mathematician. In 1711 Tipper started Delights for the Ingenious, a monthly magazine treating of mathematical questions and enigmas, and more recreational in its character. It did not, however, survive the year. Tipper died in 1713.

== Notes ==
Letters from Tipper to Humphrey Wanley, relating to the inception of the Diary, are in Ellis's Letters of Eminent Literary Men (Camden Soc. pp. 304–15).

Attribution

This article incorporates text from a publication now in the public domain: "Tipper, Thomas". Dictionary of National Biography. London: Smith, Elder & Co. 1885–1900.
