= J. Fuller =

English publisher

J. Fuller was a publisher in 18th-century England.

== Publications ==
- "A Lover of the Mathematics". A Mathematical Miscellany in Four Parts. 2nd ed., S. Fuller, Dublin, 1735. The First Part is: An Essay towards the Probable Solution of the Forty five Surprising PARADOXES, in GORDON's Geography.
- Gentleman's Diary or The Mathematical Repository (1741–1745)
