= Charlotte Caroline Richardson =

British poet and writer

- Born: 15 May 1795; Lambeth, England
- Died: 29 March 1854 (aged 57); Vauxhall, England

Charlotte Caroline Richardson (15 May 1795 – 29 March 1854) was a minor British poet and writer. Her life was shaped in part by the publication The Ladies' Diary.

== Her parents and the magazine ==
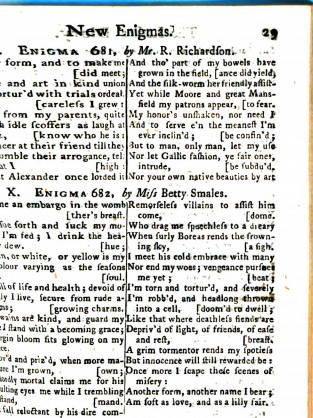
Betty Smales and R. Richardson in the Ladies Diary Almanack, for the Year of Our Lord 1786

Charlotte's father was Robert Richardson, a regular writer for the magazine The Ladies' Diary. He admired a fellow contributor to the magazine called Elizabeth Smales, who wrote enigmas in verse. Richardson had been so intrigued by "Betty Smales" that he wrote letters of admiration, and from these and a short correspondence, they were later married. This kind of exchange seems to have been encouraged by the character of the magazine that combined poetry with mathematics against the structure of an almanac. Prizes were offered to the answers to charades, verse enigmas and mathematical puzzles. Her parents' meeting and marriage via poetry was included in a later poem, "Jonah Tink", that was published by John Atkin in 1823:

I took the book, within it gaz'd,
The more I read, the more amaz'd;
I saw the name of Betty Smales,
Prefix'd to entertaining tales,
Of Richardson, her rhyming beau...

== Life ==
Charlotte Richardson was born in Lambeth on 15 May 1795 to Elizabeth and Robert Richardson. She was the youngest of three daughters. After her father's death in 1804, her mother decided to open a boarding school in Vauxhall for the dual purpose of earning an income as well as ensuring her two oldest children could be educated. She decided to temporarily send her youngest, Charlotte, to live with an aunt who, for unknown reasons, failed to return her for a decade. It was neither Charlotte or her mother's idea that she should spend her childhood in Hinderwell, Yorkshire.

In an attempt to reconnect with her family, Richardson wrote a poem in The Ladies' Diary in 1815, explicitly referring to her mother. Her mother replied in verse a year later, and Richardson reunited with her immediate family in London. All of Richardson's family (her mother and her two older sisters) regularly wrote contributions for the Ladies' Diary. In 1841, her mother died, and five years later, Richardson and her sister Elizabeth made a memoir of her life titled Poems, which was derived from her mother's contributions to The Ladies' Diary.

Her first publications were Waterloo, a Poem on the Late Victory and Isaac and Rebecca, published in 1817. The following year Richardson published Harvest, a Poem, in Two Parts: with other Poetical Pieces, which she dedicated to the editor of The Ladies' Diary, the mathematician Charles Hutton. In 1823 she published a Gothic novel, The Soldier's Child, or, Virtue Triumphant, and Ludolph, or, The Light of Nature, a Poem.

In 1826 she married a wharfinger, John Richardson. Charlotte Richardson died in Vauxhall on 29 March 1854.

== Works ==
Poetry

- Waterloo, a Poem on the Late Victory (1817)
- Isaac and Rebecca, 1817
- Harvest, a Poem, in Two Parts: with other Poetical Pieces (1818)
- Ludolph, or, The Light of Nature, a Poem (1823)

Novels

- The Soldier's Child, or, Virtue Triumphant (1823)

== Name confusion ==
The Dictionary of National Biography noted in its 48th volume in 1896 that this person had frequently been confused with other women with similar names, including Mrs. Caroline Richardson (1777–1853), and Charlotte Richardson (nee Smith) (1775-1825) who were also poets. The more modern version of this biography (Oxford Dictionary of National Biography) and this article differ substantially from the DNB version. The ODNB notes however that confusion is still possible.
