= Henry Beighton =

- Born: c.20 August 1687; Chilvers Coton near Nuneaton, Warwickshire, England
- Died: 9 October 1743 (aged 56)
- Occupations: engineer and surveyor
- Known for: working of the Griff engine
- Notable work: county map of Warwickshire
- Awards: Fellow of the Royal Society

Henry Beighton (c. 20 August 1687 – 9 October 1743) was an English engineer and surveyor.

He was born at Chilvers Coton near Nuneaton, Warwickshire and worked in the neighbouring village of Griff. In 1717, he published an engraving of the Newcomen engine erected there in 1714 by Thomas Newcomen. In 1718 he erected one at Oxclose colliery at Washington, County Durham. By measuring the work done by the Griff engine, he was able to compile a table of quantity of water that could be raised by an engine with a six-foot stroke working at 16 strokes per minute. He published this table in The Ladies' Diary which he edited at the time.

On his return to his native county he made a plane table and prepared a map of the county, which was published in 1728 at a scale of one inch to one mile.

He was elected as a Fellow of the Royal Society in 1720 and contributed four papers to the Philosophical Transactions of the Royal Society, including a description of his plane table, and of George Sorocold's waterworks at London Bridge.

His interest in the working of the Griff engine brought him into contact with J. T. Desaguliers and contributed details and illustrations of hydraulic machines for the second volume of the latter's Course of Experimental Philosophy, eventually published in 1744. This included a description by Beighton of an overshot mill, with an engraving of a corn mill by the abbey in Nuneaton. This is the earliest illustration of a mill where a single waterwheel drove more than one set of machinery.

His county map of Warwickshire was one of the first soundly based on trigonometrical survey methods. A remarkably wide range of features is depicted on the map, reflecting the whole life and economy of the county: Parish churches, chapels, depopulated places, etc. Beighton's map was well ahead of its time.
