= John Collis Nesbit =

English agricultural chemist

John Collis Nesbit (12 July 1818 – 30 March 1862) was an English agricultural chemist.

== Family life and education ==
Nesbit was born on 12 July 1818 at Bradford, Yorkshire, the son of Anthony Nesbit, a teacher, and land surveyor. Nesbit was educated at home and demonstrated an interest in the sciences and studied under John Dalton in Manchester.

== Adult life ==
Nesbit helped introduce the natural sciences into his father's school in Kennington, in 1841. Later, he took over the school and turned it into a chemical and agricultural college.

Nesbit started a consulting practice that undertook the commercial analysis of superphosphates and other artificial manures for farmers and manufacturers.

He became a Fellow of the Geological Society of London and the Chemical Society in 1845.

Nesbit discovered important phosphate deposits in the Ardennes in 1855, and wrote about guano fertilizers (The History and Properties of Natural Guanos, 1860) and other naturally occurring phosphates.

His son was Alfred Antony Nesbit (1854–1894), analytical chemist, and his daughter was Edith Nesbit, writer of popular children's books and co-founder of the Fabian Society.

Nesbit died at the home of a friend in Barnes, 30 March 1862, and was interred in the catacombs at West Norwood Cemetery.

== Sources ==
- Scott, E. L. "Nesbit, John Collis (1818–1862)". Oxford Dictionary of National Biography (online ed.). Oxford University Press. doi:10.1093/ref:odnb/19898. (Subscription, Wikipedia Library access or UK public library membership required.)
