= Pishey Thompson =

English publisher and antiquarian writer

Pishey Thompson (1784–1862) was an English publisher and antiquarian writer, known as a historian of Boston, Lincolnshire. He spent the years 1819 to 1846 in the United States.

== Life ==
Thompson was born at Peachey Hall, Freiston, near Boston, Lincolnshire. He went to work as a bank clerk in Boston. In 1811–12 he ran The Enquirer, or Literary, Mathematical, and Philosophical Repository, from Boston with William Marrat.

Emigrating to America in 1819, Thompson was in business as a bookseller and publisher on Pennsylvania Avenue, Washington. There he became acquainted with Daniel Webster, Edward Everett, and other leading figures. Thompson had numerous interests in the US, including the settlement at Albion, Illinois, and was naturalised as an American citizen, but became bankrupt. He returned to England in 1841; and went back to the US in 1843, to disappointment as far as his prospects there were concerned. His one abiding source of income was as a writer for the National Intelligencer.

Thompson returned to England in 1846. He died at Stoke Newington on 25 September 1862, and was buried at Abney Park cemetery.

== Works ==
Thompson researched Boston and the neighbouring villages, and announced his intention to publish an antiquarian work on them in 1807. Materials were published under the title of Collections for a Topographical and Historical Account of Boston and the Hundred of Skirbeck in the County of Lincoln, 1820. Much later he resumed work and eventually published in 1856 The History and Antiquities of Boston and the Villages of Skirbeck, Fishtoft, Freiston, Butterwick, Bennington, Leverton, Leake, and Wrangle, comprising the Hundred of Skirbeck in the County of Lincoln.

He republished in 1826 an expanded version of a legal work of the exiled United Irishman, abolitionist and advocate of codification, William Sampson, from 1824.

== Family ==
Thompson was married to Jane Tonge, but had no children by her; she published a volume of verse. He fathered an illegitimate son, John Wright (born 1824), by Mary Wright, daughter of Richard Wright.

== Notes ==
Attribution

This article incorporates text from a publication now in the public domain: Lee, Sidney, ed. (1898). "Thompson, Pishey". Dictionary of National Biography. Vol. 56. London: Smith, Elder & Co.
