= Thomas Stephens Davies =

British mathematician

Thomas Stephens Davies FRS FRSE (1795–1851) was a British mathematician.

== Life ==
He was born on 1 January 1795.

Davies made his earliest communications to the Leeds Correspondent in July 1817 and the Gentleman's Diary for 1819. He subsequently contributed largely to the Gentleman's and Lady's Diary, Clay's Scientific Receptacle, the Monthly Magazine, the Philosophical Magazine, the Bath and Bristol Magazine, and the Mechanics' Magazine. Davies was elected a Fellow of the Society of Antiquaries of London, 19 March 1840

Davies's early acquaintance with Dr. William Trail, the author of the Life of Dr. Robert Simson, materially influenced his course of study and made him familiar with the old as well as with the modern professors of geometry. He became a fellow of the Royal Society of Edinburgh in 1831, and he contributed several original and elaborate papers to its Transactions. He also published Researches on Terrestrial Magnetism in the Philosophical Transactions, Determination of the Law of Resistance to a Projectile in the Mechanics' Magazine, and other papers in the Cambridge and Dublin Mathematical Journal, the Civil Engineer, the Athenæum, the Westminster Review, and Notes and Queries.

In 1831 he was elected a Fellow of the Royal Society of Edinburgh his proposer being John Shoolbred. In April, 1833 he was elected a Fellow of the Royal Society.

In 1834, he was appointed one of the mathematical masters in the Royal Military Academy at Woolwich. Among the numerous subjects that engaged his attention were researches on the properties of the trapezium, Pascal's hexagramme mystique, Brianchon's theorem, symmetrical properties of plane triangles, and researches into the geometry of three dimensions. His new system of spherical geometry preserves his name in the list of well-known mathematicians.

His presentation "On the Velocipede" in May 1837 is extant as a manuscript and gives a vivid testimony of the rise and putting down of the draisines aka hobby-horses. He must have been an early hobby-horse rider himself according to that (transcript in The Boneshaker #108(1985) pp. 4–9 and #111(1986) pp. 7–12))

His death, after six years of illness, took place at Broomhall Cottage, Shooter's Hill, Kent, on 6 January 1851, when he was in his fifty-seventh year.

== Publications ==
Davies edited the following works:

- A Course of Mathematics for the use of the Royal Military Academy, by Charles Hutton. The eleventh edition by Olinthus Gregory, 1837, 2 vols.; the principal alterations, additions, and improvements in this work were made by Davies.
- Solutions of the Principal Questions in Dr. Hutton's “Course of Mathematics,” 1840.
- A Course of Mathematics, by C. Hutton, continued by O. Gregory; twelfth edition by T. S. Davies, 1841–1843, 2 vols.
- The Mathematician, ed. by T. S. Davies and others, 1845, 1847, and 1850.

Of the above, Solutions of the Principal Questions is the most important work. It is a large octavo of 560 pages, enriched with four thousand solutions on nearly all subjects of mathematical interest and of various degrees of difficulty.

A long catalogue of Davies's writings is printed in the Westminster Review, April 1851, pp. 70–83.
