= Jane Tonge Thompson =

British writer & diarist (1786–1851)

- Born: February 17, 1786
- Died: July 15, 1851
- Spouse: Pishey Thompson (1807-1851)

Jane Tonge Thompson (1786–1851) was a 19th-century British writer and diarist. She was married to the British antiquarian Pishey Thompson.

== Early life ==
Jane Tonge was born on 17 February 1786 in Boston, Lincolnshire to John and Susanna Tonge. She was "the descendant of a French Huguenot family, which reverse of circumstances had reduced from affluence to the rank of small tradespeople." She had several siblings: John, Mary, Richard, and Susanna.

In September 1804, Jane met Pishey Thompson, also of Boston, at a ball. 6 Nov 1807, Jane married him.

== Years in America ==
Jane left England in 1818 for America. Pishey Thompson moved to the United States in 1819. It was suggested, in 1864, that Jane traveled to the United States before her husband did, on the advice of a physician who believed the climate would be more salubrious than the fennish climate of Lincolnshire, and that the climate benefited her so greatly that Pishey decided to move to the United States for her. The couple primarily resided in Washington, D.C..

In 1823, Jane's husband had an affair with Mary Wright, the daughter of a Unitarian reverend, who had apparently followed the Thompsons from Lincolnshire to the US; and on 23 April 1824, the two had an illegitimate son named John Wright. Pishey's biographer Isabel Bailey suggests that, despite this situation, "an affectionate relationship, without rancour, subsisted between all concerned," though she does not specify whether Jane was among those concerned.

In her diary, on Jan 27, 1840, she writes, “Seventeen years have elapsed since the death of _____”. It has been suggested that she may have lost a child in 1823, largely based on her poem “On the Funeral of an Infant,” which is dated 1826. It is worth noting, she would have been around 37 in 1823. The diary entry may refer to the death of her mother on Jan 28, 1823.

Jane’s views on abolition are unknown. (Her husband was part of the American Colonization Society.)

== Later life and death ==
The couple returned to England in 1846.

Jane died 15 July 1851. She had no children. Despite his affair, her husband was apparently quite attached to her, and kept her wedding ring until his death, when he chose to be buried with it on his finger. She is buried, beside her husband, "in the burial-ground of the Gravel-Pit Chapel, belonging to the Unitarian denomination, at Hackney."

== Writing ==
Jane was described as "a lady of great force and originality of character and mind, possessing not only literary tastes, but literary capacity." Her major publication was a book of poetry entitled Solitary Musings. This was, apparently, originally printing for private circulation in Washington, DC, where the couple resided. These poems often have biographical threads. They discuss her relationship with her sister Susan and her father, and the loneliness of being so far from her family.

She was also believed to have contributed a chapter to Change for American Notes, a 19th-century response to Charles Dickens' work American Notes.

== Legacy ==
Jane left behind her written work, as well as several diaries. These records present her unique account of life in 19th-century United States. As Pishey had befriended George Flowers, a brewer in Stratford-upon-Avon, several of her diaries, as well as letters she received from her husband during the early years of her marriage, are held at the Shakespeare Birthplace Trust.
