= Leeds Correspondent =

The Leeds Correspondent was an English literary and philosophical biannual journal of the early 19th century. It was printed and published at Leeds by James Nichols, and appeared from 1814 to 1823. It was noted for a strong emphasis on mathematics. It was also an example of efforts by Nichols and others to see that the economic growth of Leeds should be reflected by "the emergence of locally produced literary periodicals, in conscious imitation of the national quarterlies".

== History ==
Nichols edited the literary matter of the Leeds Correspondent. Its first mathematical editor was John Ryley (1747–1815); he was the headmaster of the Leeds bluecoat school. He was succeeded by John Gawthorp of Leeds, and then John Whitley of Masbrough who took over when Gawthorp fell ill. Gawthorp, who ran a Lancasterian school in Leeds, died in 1817. Contributors included:

- John Butterworth of Haggate (1774–1845)
- Jonathan Crowther
- Thomas Stephens Davies
- Thomas Gaskin
- Joseph Hine of Tyldesley
- John Kay of Royton (1781–1824), a pupil of Butterworth
- William Marrat
- Anthony Nesbit
- John Henry Swale of Liverpool (1775–1837)
- Mary West of Guisborough, sister of the Wesleyan minister Francis Athow West, teacher of a girls' school in Westgate, Guisborough.

The Correspondent had London distribution from 1818 through Baldwin, Cradock & Joy. It appeared in five volumes.
