= The Lady's and Gentleman's Diary =

British periodical (1841–1871)

The Lady's and Gentleman's Diary was a recreational mathematics magazine formed as a successor of The Ladies' Diary and Gentleman's Diary in 1841. It was published annually between 1841 and 1871 by the Company of Stationers; its editor from 1844 to 1865 was Wesley S. B. Woolhouse. It consisted mostly of problems posed by its readers, with their solutions given in later volumes, though it also contained word puzzles and poetry. The magazine was based in London. It ceased publication in 1871. This should not be confused with Ladies and Gentlemens Diary, or Royal Almanack (1775 to 1786) which was printed by Thomas Carnan and edited by Reuben Burrow and was a short lived competitor to The Ladies' Diary.

Kirkman's schoolgirl problem originated in a question in the magazine.
