= Richard Bissell Prosser =

British patent examiner (1838–1918)

Richard Bissell Prosser (25 August 1838 – 18 March 1918) was a patent examiner and a biographical writer. He was the eldest son of Richard Prosser, the Birmingham, England, engineer and inventor. R. B. Prosser was educated at University College School, London where he was a fellow pupil of Joseph Chamberlain.

Richard Prosser was heavily involved with the introduction of the Patent Law Amendment Act 1852, and his 700-volume library, combined with that of Bennet Woodcroft, (1803–1879) formed the basis of the Patent Office Library, which opened on 5 March 1854.

Richard Prosser died in 1854; in 1856 R. B. Prosser joined the Office of the Commissioners of Patents, London, where he later rose to become Chief Examiner. He was forced to retire early, in 1888, because of partial blindness, but continued to take an active part in local government and church life in St Pancras, London, where he lived. He was much involved in national Church of England organisations. He married Anne Ostell, daughter of William Ostell of Bloomsbury, London; she died in 1911. They had a daughter and three sons.

R. B. Prosser was greatly interested in technical history, and in particular the biographies of inventors. This was due to his work on patents, where he needed to be able to assess the priority of them – a knowledge of patents history was vital for this. He wrote 58 lives for the Dictionary of National Biography, and supplied much material for the New English Dictionary. Prosser also wrote Birmingham Inventors and Inventions, 1881, in a limited edition of 50 copies. This was a cumulation of notes he had published earlier in the Birmingham Gazette. A similar work on Manchester inventors was never finished. His 315 contributions to 'St Pancras Notes and Queries' in the St. Pancras Guardian between 3 February 1897 and 2 January 1903 were later published in a book of 150 copies. He was a frequent contributor to Notes and Queries, as well as to technical periodicals. Prosser had in mind to write a history of invention, written around the abstracts of British Patent Specifications, but the project never got further than the planning stage.

Prosser died, aged 79. His library was dispersed by auction, and his files of biographical notes were sold for about £50. They surfaced again in the 1970s, to be bought by the British Library, Dept of Manuscripts, Add Ms 54,496 – 54,507. They comprise 24 volumes and cover over 1600 names. More of Prosser's papers are in Birmingham and Manchester reference libraries, having been presented either by himself in his lifetime or by his family after his death. The on-line catalogue of the National Archives lists small collections of Prosser's papers for patentees in the South West of England, Northamptonshire and Buckinghamshire. These might be part of his history of inventions project, noted above.

Prosser was a pioneer of the study of technical history, as his published biographies and manuscript records show.
