= Jerónimo de Ayanz y Beaumont =

Spanish inventor (1553–1613)

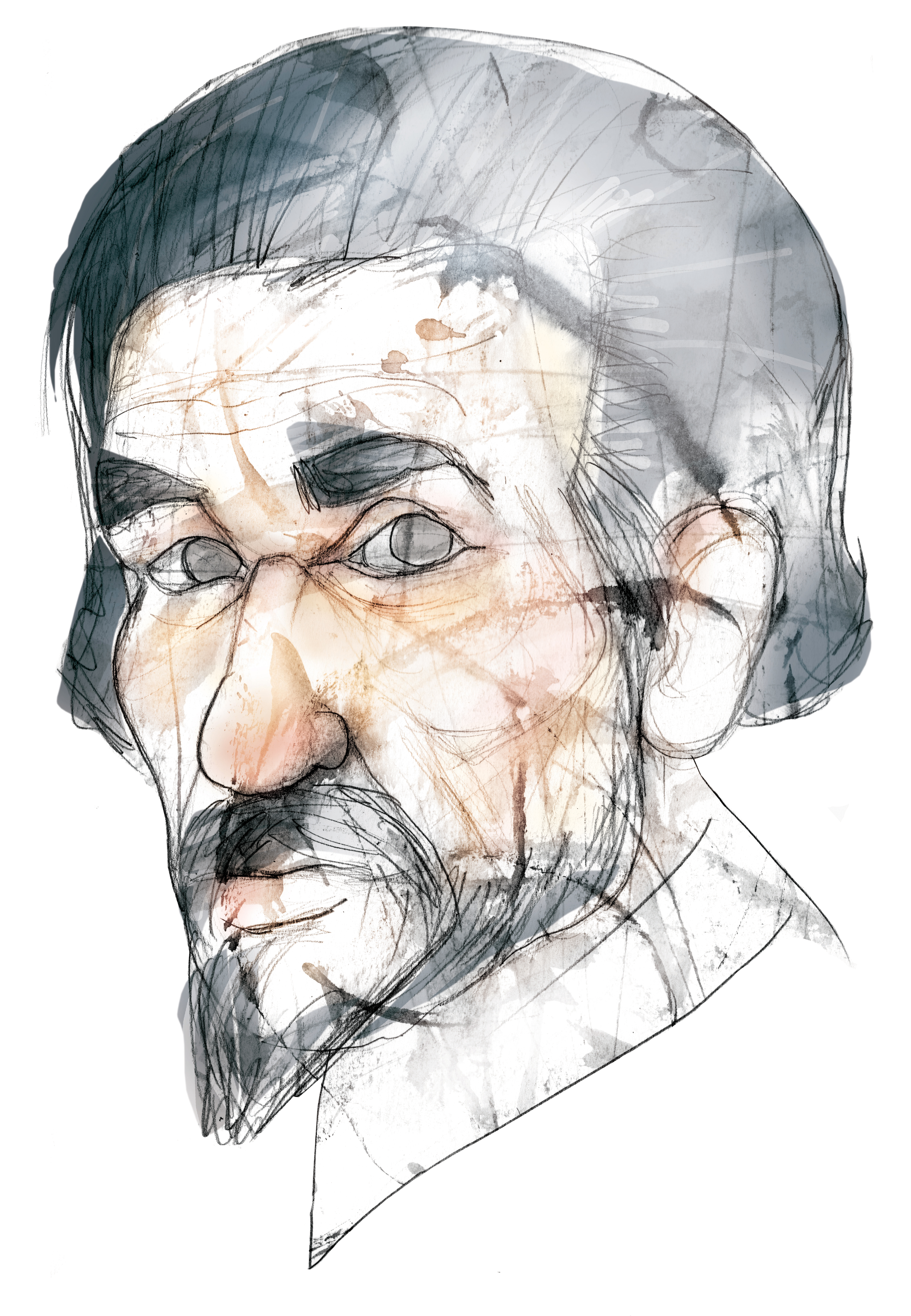
- Portrait of Jerónimo de Ayanz y Beaumont. Fundación Española para la Ciencia y la Tecnología, Eulogia Merle.
- Born: 1553; Guenduláin, Cizur, Kingdom of Navarre, Crown of Castile
- Died: March 23, 1613 (aged 59–60); Madrid, Crown of Castile
- Resting place: Murcia Cathedral
- Occupations: Engineer, inventor, soldier, astronomer, artist

Signature
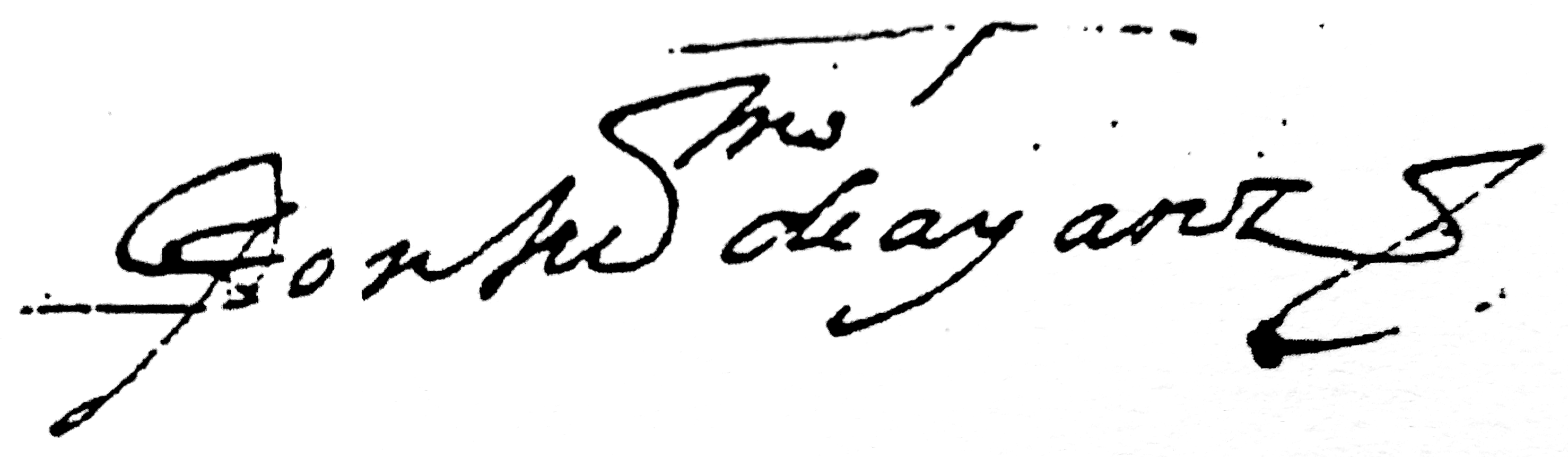

Jerónimo de Ayanz y Beaumont (1553 – 23 March 1613) was a Spanish soldier, painter, astronomer, musician and inventor. He pioneered the use and design of the steam engine, as well as mining ventilation systems, improved scientific instrumentation, developed windmills and new types of furnaces for metallurgical, industrial, military, and even domestic operations. He invented a diving bell, patented an immersion suit tested before the court of Felipe III in Pisuerga, on August 2, 1602, and designed a submarine.

== Biography ==
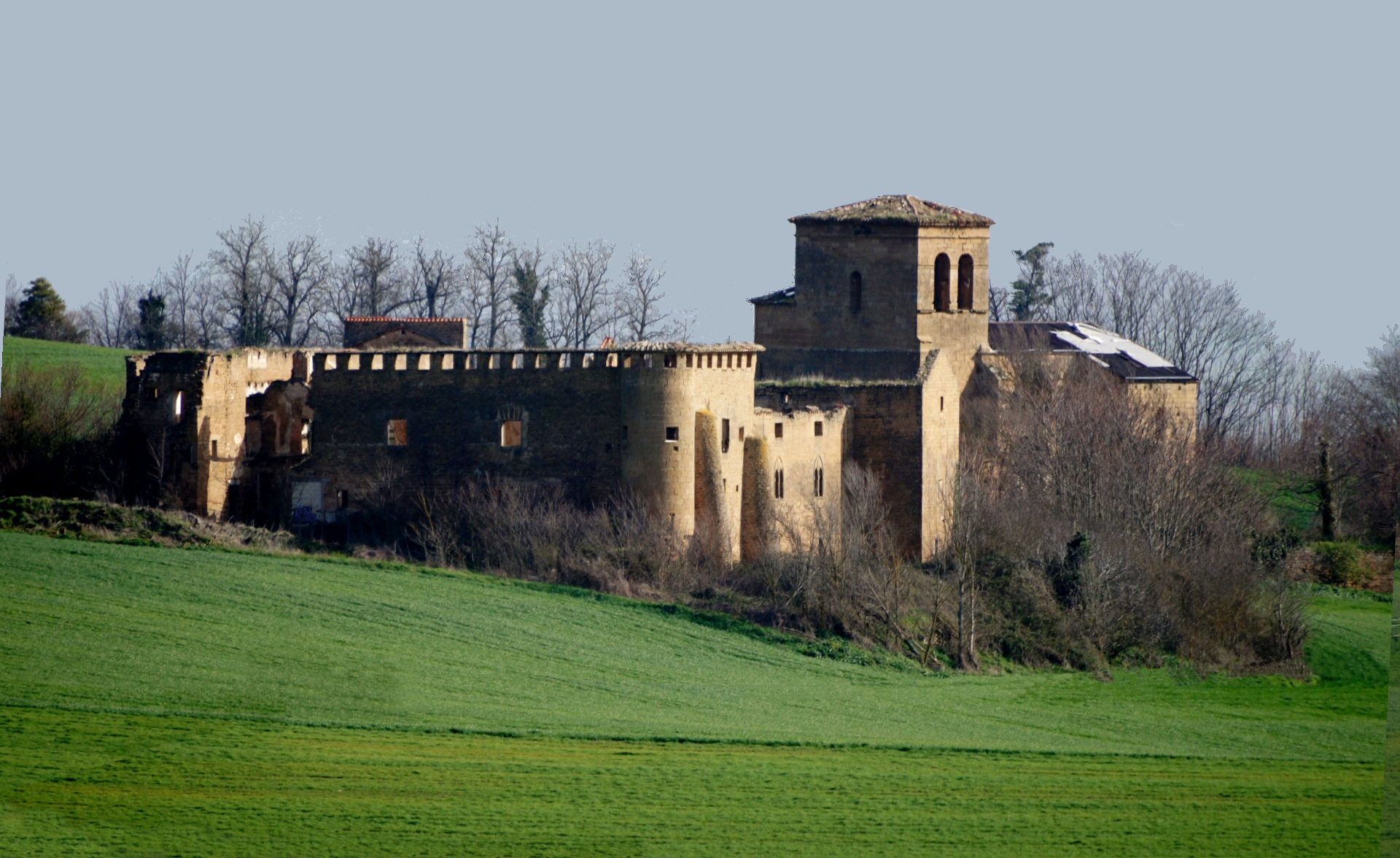
Palacio de Guenduláin (Cizur), birthplace of Jerónimo de Ayanz, next to the Camino de Santiago.

He was born in Guendulain (Cizur) (Navarre), the son of Carlos de Ayanz, captain of the Pamplona garrison, and Catalina de Beaumont. He was the second of the male siblings, the eldest being Don Francés de Ayanz, born a year earlier. His mother, Doña Catalina de Beaumont y Navarra, instilled in her children the principles of an education appropriate to her rank. He spent his childhood in the Guenduláin manor until in 1567 he went to serve King Felipe II as a page. At court he was instructed in military skills, letters, the arts, and mathematics, which later would serve him for his studies of cosmography.

=== Military career ===
His father, Carlos de Ayanz, took part in the campaigns in France, participating in the battle of St. Quentin in 1557 and in the punitive expedition to the then pirate port of San Juan de Luz. Jerónimo, after his training in El Escorial, began his military career in 1571. In 1573 he participated in campaigns in Tunisia, under the orders of John of Austria. Failing the defense of La Goleta, in 1574 he was assigned to Lombardy, where he served under the command of Alexander Farnese for a few years.

He made the Spanish Road, from Milan to Namur, together with his companions from the tercio under the command of Lope de Figueroa, in the record time of 32 days, in the middle of winter, to go to Flanders at the call of the Duke of Alba. He participated in the battle of Gembloux, in 1578, and in the assault on the city of Zierikzee he carried out one of his legendary feats when, badly wounded, he continued to fight until he got rid of his attackers. It was these events that Lope de Vega reflected on later in his comedy titled Lo que pasa en una tarde (What happens in an afternoon, 1617), referring to him as "the new Alcides" and "the knight with the bronze fingers", due to his ability to break plates with just two fingers.

In 1579 he was in Madrid, convalescent, and received some income from Felipe II in recognition of his actions in Flanders. The following year, he commanded a detachment to participate, under the orders of Sancho Dávila, in the Portuguese campaign. In 1581 he prevented the attack that a Frenchman planned against Felipe II. In 1582, under the orders of the Marquis of Santa Cruz, he boarded the ships that headed for the Azores participated in the Battle of Vila Franca do Campo. For this courage and bravery, the king awarded him the Military Order of Calatrava. On May 7, 1582, he had received the Ballesteros de Calatrava Commandery and years later, on January 30, 1595, he would receive the Abanilla Commandery.

In 1587 he was appointed general administrator of Minas del Reino (Kingdom Mines), the management of the 550 mines that were then in Spain and those that were exploited in America. He was able to solve some of the serious mining problems of that time.

Settled and residing in Murcia, where he would act as alderman for a long time, he was concerned about the safety of the coast, achieving the establishment in Cartagena of part of the fleet established in Barcelona, giving way, since then, to the current naval base. In 1589 he gathered a Murcian troop and, together with his brother Francés, who had also gathered Navarrese troops at his expense, went to La Coruña in support of Juan Padilla, captain of the garrison, where a determined María Pita successfully stopped Francis Drake and his Counter Armada.

He was also governor of Martos until 1597.

=== Tomb ===
He died from an illness in Madrid, in 1613. According to his wishes, his body was transferred to the city of Murcia, resting in the Convent of San Antonio. He was later moved to the Capilla del Socorro, located in the ambulatory of the Murcia Cathedral, a chapel that belonged to the Dávalos, a family with which he had become related after his marriage to Blanca de Pagán Fajardo, and widower of the latter, with his sister Luisa, after being appointed by Felipe II Commander of Abanilla (Order of Calatrava) and then Councilor of Murcia.

== Patented inventions ==
Up to 48 inventions were recognized in 1606 by the privilegio de invención (invention privilege)—as patents had been called at the time—signed by Philip III.

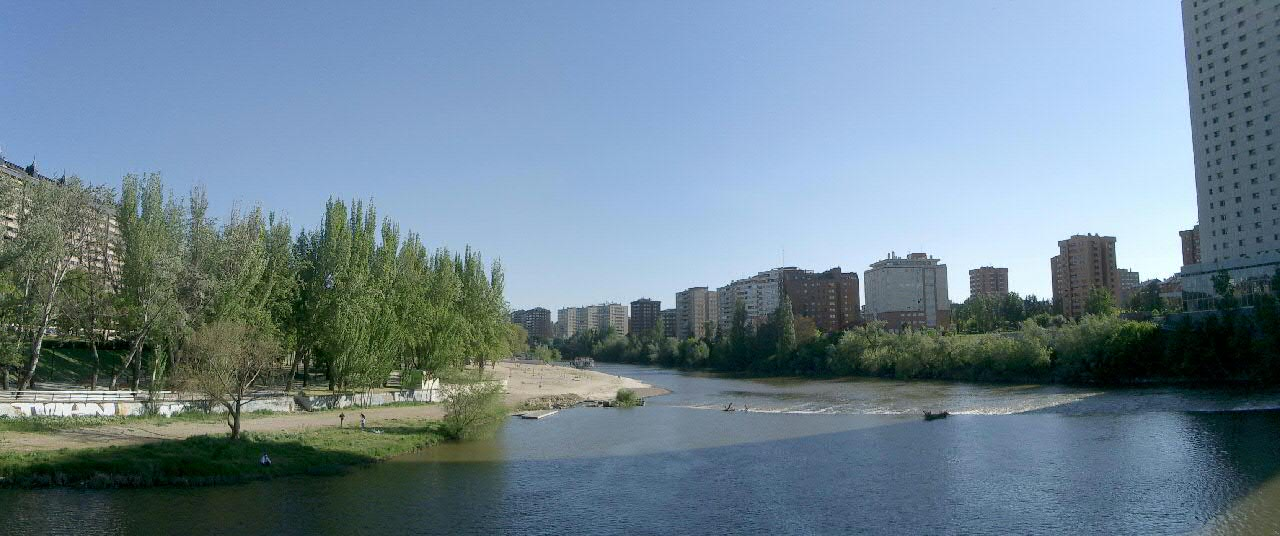
Pisuerga River where the diving suit was demonstrated

- He built an air-renovated diving suit that allowed a man to remain underwater in the Pisuerga river on 2 August 1602. The diver spent an hour underwater before being ordered to return by King Philip III.
- He also designed "a submersible load barge and a smaller bathyscaphe, both of them equipped with oars, gloves and portholes to manipulate things, floating snorkels to renovate the air from the inside via pumps, and even commodities, like an inner water-powered fan to cool down the crew."
- He patented a steam-powered pump system to drain water and gas out of the mines after a mining accident in which he almost died in a mine tunnel. This mechanism was successfully tested in Guadalcanal.

He is best remembered for the invention of the first steam-powered water pump for draining mines, for which he was granted a patent by the Spanish monarchy in 1606.

He also improved scientific equipment, windmills and developed new types of furnaces for industrial, military and household use. He invented a bell-like diving suit and designed a submarine.

Designs of Jerónimo de Ayanz

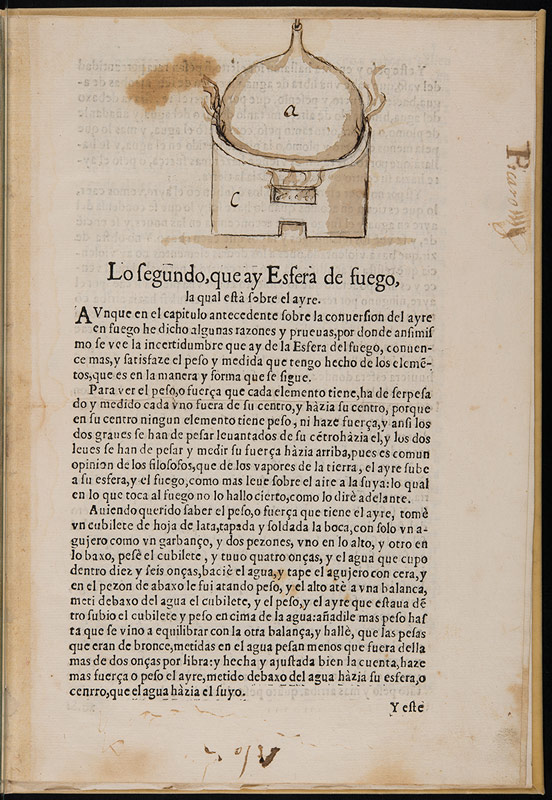

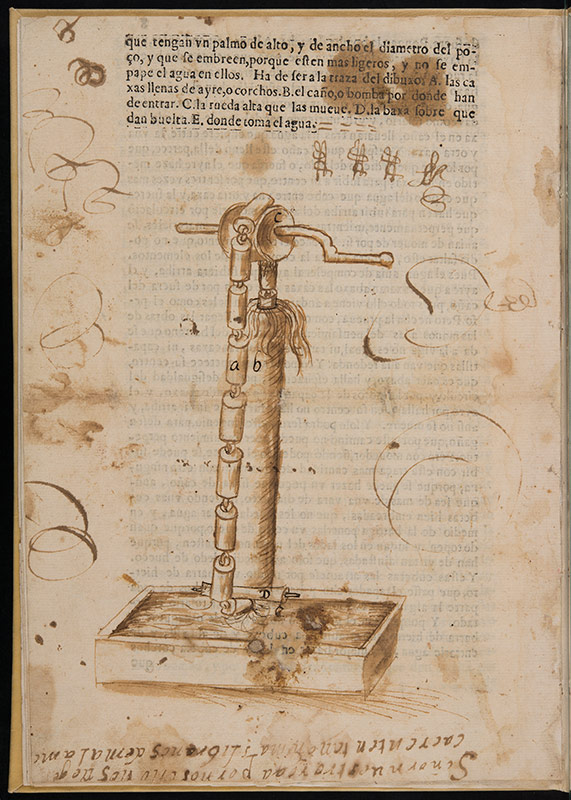

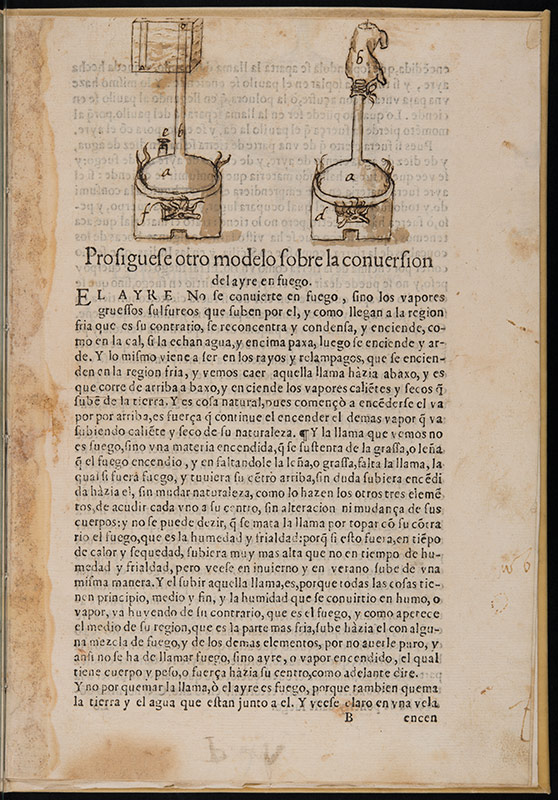

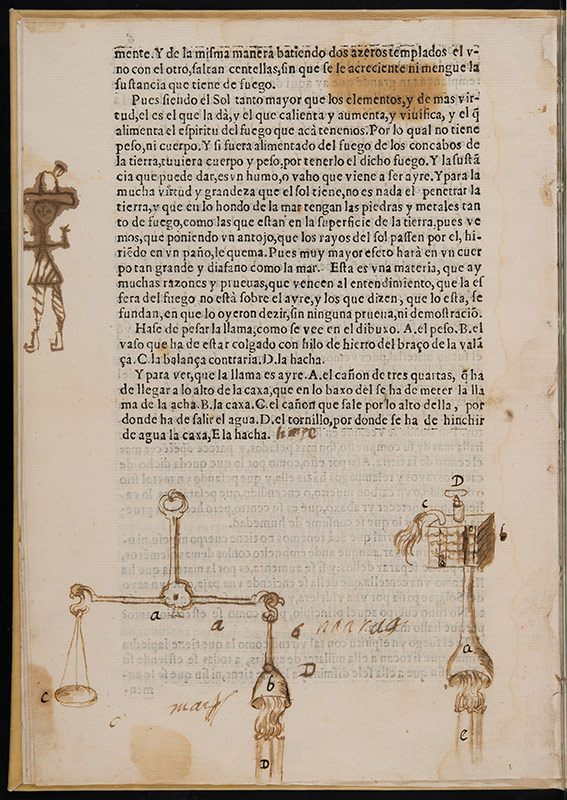

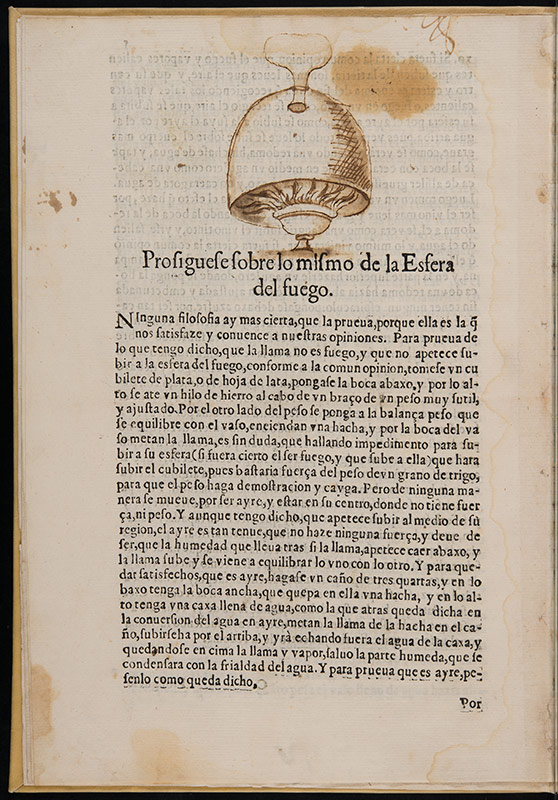

== See also ==
- Steam engine
- History of the steam engine

== Sources ==
- Davids, Karel & Davids, Carolus A. (2012). Religion, Technology, and the Great and Little Divergences: China and Europe Compared, C. 700-1800. Brill. ISBN 9789004233881.
- Sandman, Alison (2003). "Un inventor navarro: Jeronimo de Ayanz y Beaumont, 1553-1613 (review)". Technology and Culture. 44 (2): 379–381. doi:10.1353/tech.2003.0089. ISSN 1097-3729. S2CID 110520374.
- Howes, Anton. "Age of Invention: The Spanish Engine". antonhowes.substack.com.
