= Angle Ring =

Engineering firm based in Tipton, West Midlands, UK

The Angle Ring Company
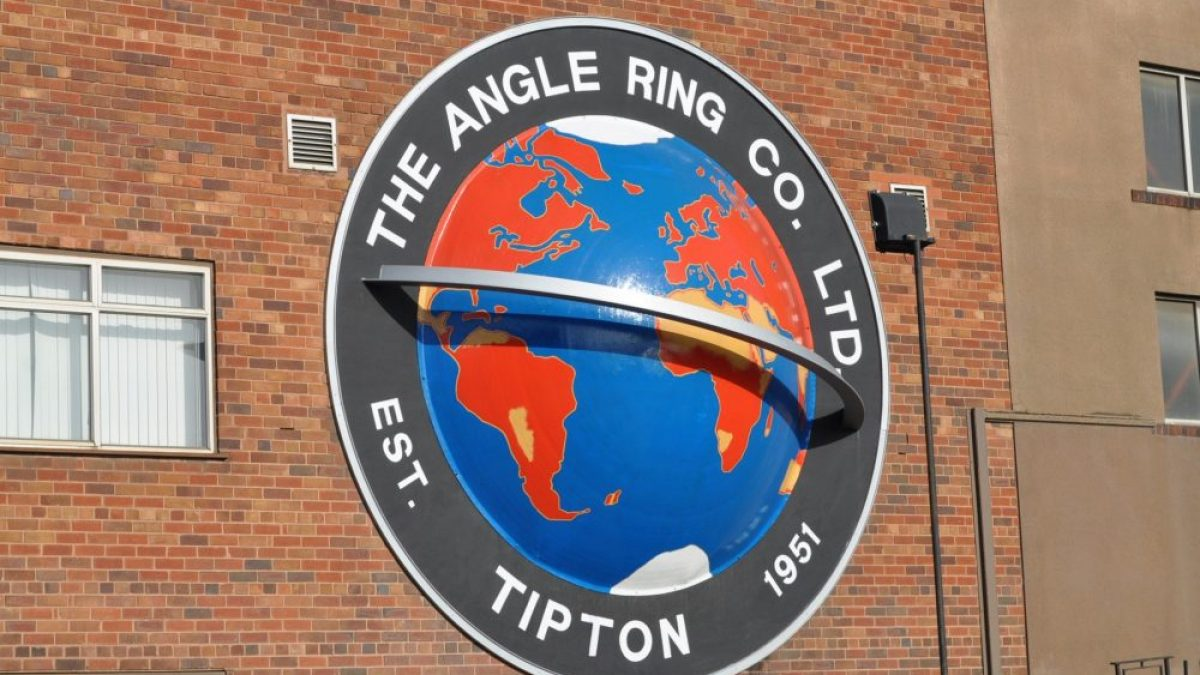
- Sculpture at entrance to factory, Tipton
- Type: Private
- Industry: Engineering; Steel fabrication
- Founded: 1951; 75 years ago in Tipton, England
- Founder: Frank Barnshaw
- Headquarters: Tipton, West Midlands, England
- Area served: Worldwide
- Key people: Daniel Barnshaw (MD)
- Products: Curved steel sections, plates and tubes
- Website: anglering.com

The Angle Ring Company is a British metalworking firm specialising in the bending and curving of metal and alloys. It is based in Tipton, West Midlands, England.

== History ==
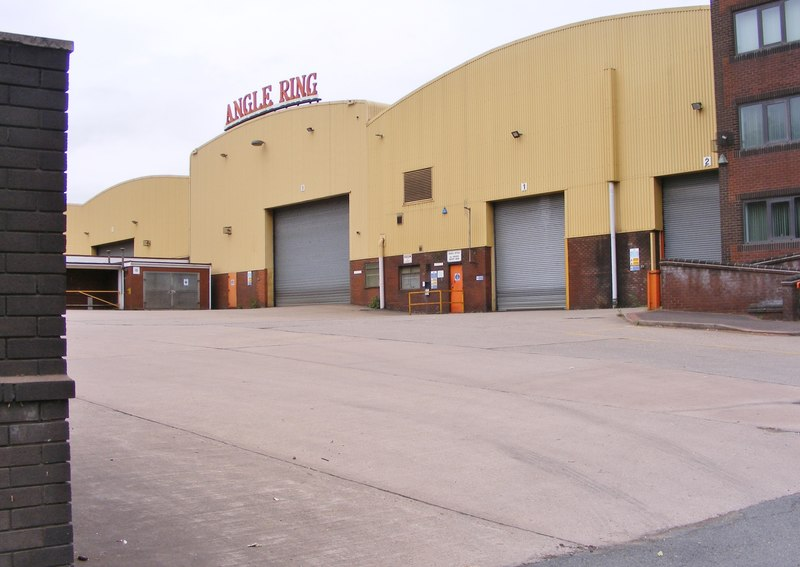
Factory, 2018

The Angle Ring Company was founded in 1951 by Frank Barnshaw at a site on Bloomfield Road in Tipton. The business was incorporated as a private limited company on 29 July 1957.

The company remains family-owned, having passed to a third generation of the Barnshaw family. Daniel Barnshaw serves as managing director, and his brother Mike Barnshaw also works in the business.

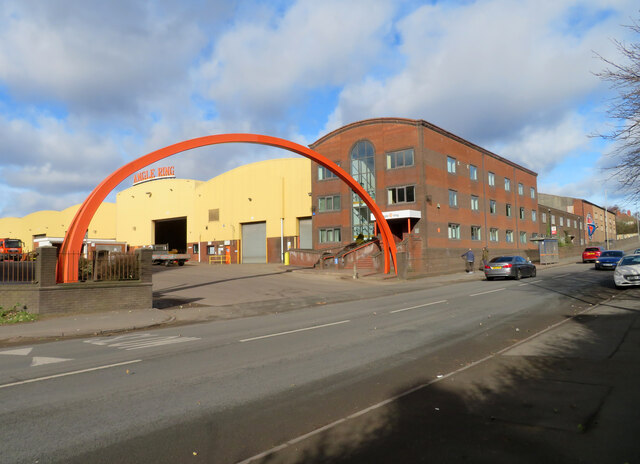
Arch at factory entrance

Over its history, Angle Ring has supplied curved steelwork to a number of architectural and infrastructure projects. The firm was contracted by Cleveland Bridge UK to induction-bend 800 metres of square hollow section for the lateral rings of the Wembley Arch at Wembley Stadium, which was designed by Foster and Partners; the company also supplied curved sections for the adjacent White Horse Bridge. Other projects to which Angle Ring contributed curved steelwork include the retractable roof of No. 1 Court at the All England Lawn Tennis Club, the James Joyce Bridge in Dublin designed by Santiago Calatrava, the Sage Gateshead concert hall, the Yas Island Hotel on the Abu Dhabi Grand Prix circuit, The Kelpies sculptures near Falkirk, and the Cody Dock rolling bridge in east London. The Tipton firm's contribution to The Kelpies, which house 928 steel plates and more than 34,000 individual components, was featured in a 2014 BBC documentary on the sculptures' construction.

In 2025, Angle Ring contributed to the Ideas Happen Here light installation in Birmingham's Jewellery Quarter, a permanent feature of the Birmingham Light Festival commissioned by Taylex Group and designed by Rough Diamond. Later in the year, the firm supplied curved steel sections for the Waterside Bridge over the River Trent in Nottingham, the first new bridge built across the river in the city since Clifton Bridge in 1958. In December 2025, Antonia Bance, the Labour MP for Tipton and Wednesbury, visited the firm at the invitation of the British Constructional Steelwork Association as part of a national programme highlighting the UK steel sector.
