= The Ladies' Diary =

British periodical (1704–1841)

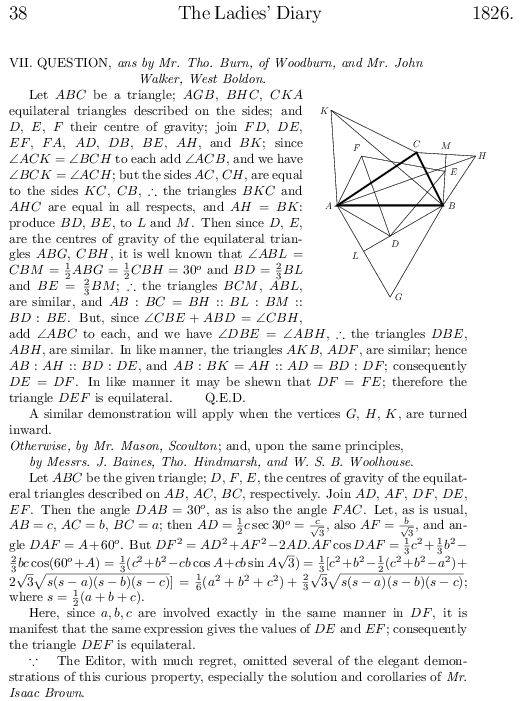
Extract from the 1826 Ladies' Diary, giving geometric and analytic proofs for Napoleon's theorem

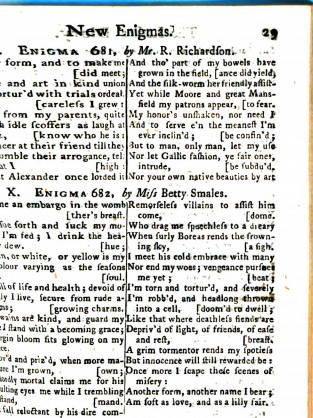
Betty Smales and R.Richardson wrote for the Ladies Diary Almanack, for the Year of Our Lord 1786 and married via the magazines pages. Charlotte Caroline Richardson was one of the results.

The Ladies' Diary: or, Woman's Almanack appeared annually in London from 1704 to 1841 after which it was succeeded by The Lady's and Gentleman's Diary. It featured material relating to calendars etc. including sunrise and sunset times and phases of the moon, as well as important dates (eclipses, holidays, school terms, etc.), and a chronology of remarkable events.

== Contents ==
The subtitle indicated its serious purpose: "Containing New Improvements in ARTS and SCIENCES, and many entertaining PARTICULARS: Designed for the USE AND DIVERSION OF THE FAIR SEX." These included riddles (called enigmas), rebuses, charades, scientific queries, and mathematical questions. A typical volume in the series included answers submitted by readers to problems posed the previous year and a set of new problems, nearly all proposed by readers. Both puzzle and answer (revealed the following year) were often in verse. Each cover featured a picture of a prominent English woman.

Sometimes the subtitles were even more specific. For example, in 1836 the full title was The Ladies Diary, For the Year of Our Lord 1835, Being the Third After Bissextile. Designed specifically For the Amusement and Entertainment of The Fair Sex With An Appendix of Curious and Valuable Mathematical Papers For the Use of Students. The Hundred and Thirty Second Almanack Published of this Kind. Also The Gentleman's Diary Or, The Mathematical Repository; An Almanack For the Year of Our Lord 1835 and 1836 Being The Third or Bissextile or Leap Year Containing many Useful and entertaining Particulars peculiarly adapted to the Ingenious Gentleman engaged in the delightful Study and Practice of the Mathematics.

The first editor and publisher, John Tipper, began the almanac by publishing a calendar, recipes, medicinal advice, stories and ended with "special rhyming riddles." By the 1709 issue, the contents changed to exclude recipes, medicinal advice, and stories and include more puzzles from both Tipper and those sent in by readers.

The second editor, Henry Beighton, took over the almanac after Tipper's death in 1713. He continued to publish the almanac rich in puzzles, and in 1720 began to include more difficult puzzles dealing with Newtonian infinitesimal calculus.

Joan Baum notes that

Although the Ladies' Diary (or Woman's Almanac, 1704–1841), the most popular of the mathematical periodicals, encouraged women to join wit with beauty, it attracted serious amateurs of both sexes. Not a prestigious publication like Taylor's Scientific Memoirs[...] the Ladies' Diary was nonetheless a respectable place to pose mathematical problems and sustain debate. The Edinburgh Review notes that along with the Diary's more fanciful material, some of it downright silly, "much good mathematics" was buried in its pages. In fact, since there were few science periodicals in England until the 1830s, technical articles often appeared in general periodicals like the Ladies' Diary.

== See also ==
- List of 18th-century British periodicals for women
- List of scientific journals in mathematics
- Gentleman's Diary
- The Lady's and Gentleman's Diary

== Bibliography ==
- Leder, Gilah (1981) The Ladies' Diary. Australian Mathematics Teacher 37(2):3–5.
- Perl, Teri (1977) The Ladies' Diary. . .Circa 1700. Mathematics Teacher 70(4):354–358.
- Costa, Shelly (2002) The Ladies' Diary: Gender, Mathematics, and Civil Society in Early Eighteenth-Century England
- Perl, Teri (1979) "The Ladies' Diary or Woman's Almanack, 1704–1841." Historia Mathematica 6 (1979), 36–53.
