= Gentleman's Diary =

Gentleman's Diary or The Mathematical Repository
- Discipline: Mathematics
- Language: English

Publication details
- Former name(s): The Mathematical Repository: An Almanack
- History: Published annually from 1741–1800
- Publisher: Printed for J. Fuller

Standard abbreviations
- ISO 4: Gentlem. Diary

Indexing
- OCLC no.: 5535685

Links
- Journal homepage

Gentleman's Diary or The Mathematical Repository was (a supplement to) an almanac published at the end of the 18th century in England, including mathematical problems.

The supplement was also known as: "The mathematical repository: an almanack" or "A Collection of mathematical problems and ænigmas".

== Publication ==
- Serial Publication: Annual 5 v. tables. 16 cm
- Publisher: Printed for J. Fuller (1741–1745)
- Place of publication: London, England
- Continued by: The Ladies' Diary and then The Lady's and Gentleman's Diary
- Language: English
- OCLC: 5535685
- Journal began: 1741 Ceased publication: 1800
- Libraries worldwide that own item: University of Illinois, University of Oklahoma

== See also ==
- List of scientific journals in mathematics
- The Ladies' Diary
- The Lady's and Gentleman's Diary
