= Hartmanice =

Hartmanice may refer to places in the Czech Republic:

- Hartmanice (České Budějovice District), a municipality and village in the South Bohemian Region
- Hartmanice (Klatovy District), a town in the Plzeň Region
- Hartmanice (Svitavy District), a municipality and village in the Pardubice Region
