= Závraty =

- Municipality
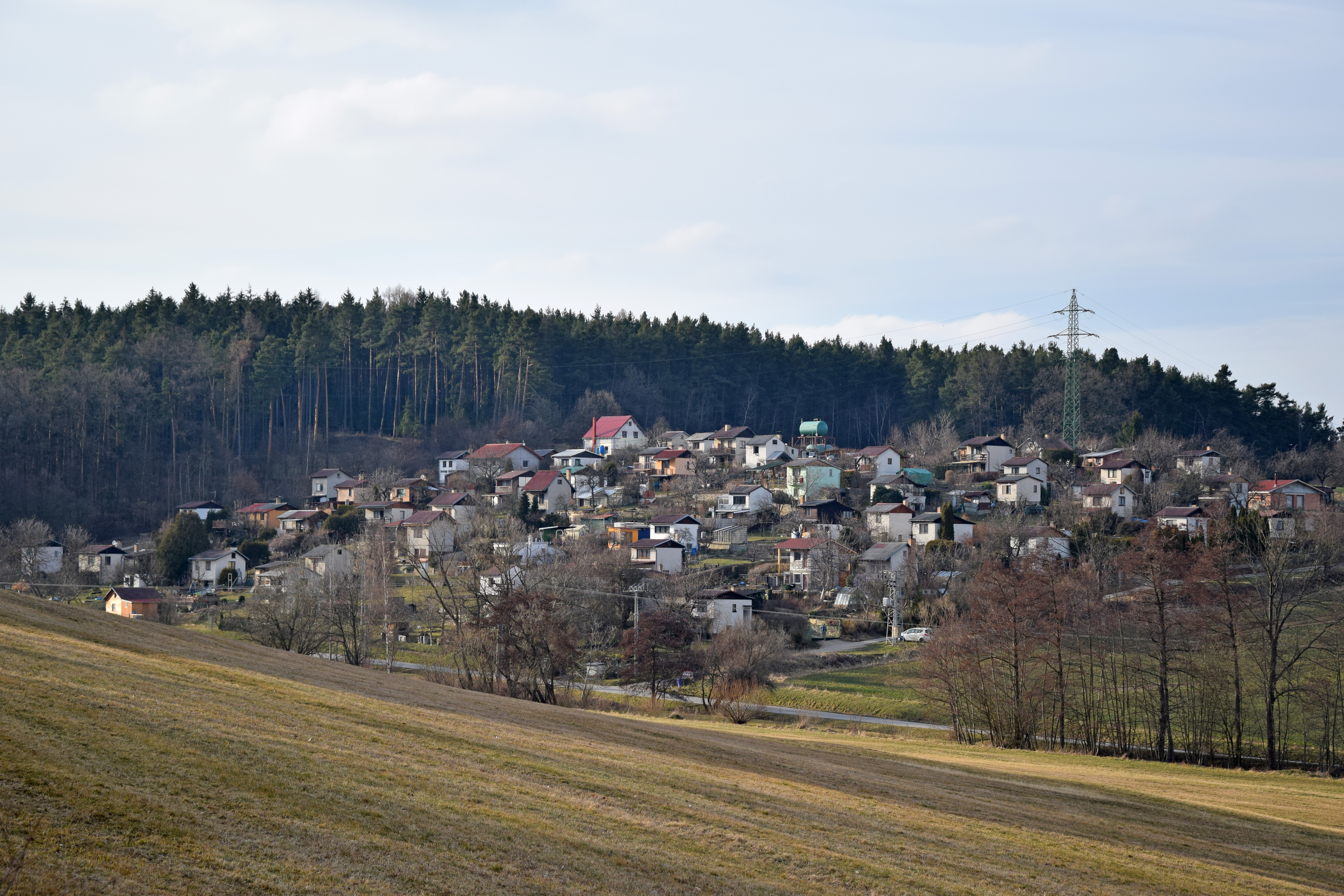
- General view

- Location in the Czech Republic
- Coordinates: 48°56′17″N 14°22′53″E
- Country: Czech Republic
- Region: South Bohemian
- District: České Budějovice
- First mentioned: 1365

Area
  - Total: 2.08 km^{2} (0.80 sq mi)
- Elevation: 435 m (1,427 ft)

Population (2026-01-01)
  - Total: 62
  - Density: 30/km^{2} (77/sq mi)
- Time zone: UTC+1 (CET)
  - Summer (DST): UTC+2 (CEST)
- Postal code: 373 82
- Website: www.obeczavraty.cz

Závraty is a municipality and village in České Budějovice District in the South Bohemian Region of the Czech Republic. It has about 60 inhabitants.

Závraty lies approximately 8 kilometres (5 mi) south-west of České Budějovice and 128 km (80 mi) south of Prague.

== Demographics ==
Historical population
Year	Pop.	±%
1869	146	—
1880	128	−12.3%
1890	110	−14.1%
1900	129	+17.3%
1910	146	+13.2%
1921	128	−12.3%
1930	145	+13.3%
1950	99	−31.7%
1961	133	+34.3%
1970	120	−9.8%
1980	70	−41.7%
1991	31	−55.7%
2001	34	+9.7%
2011	42	+23.5%
2021	56	+33.3%
Source: Censuses
