= Bečice (České Budějovice District) =

- Municipality
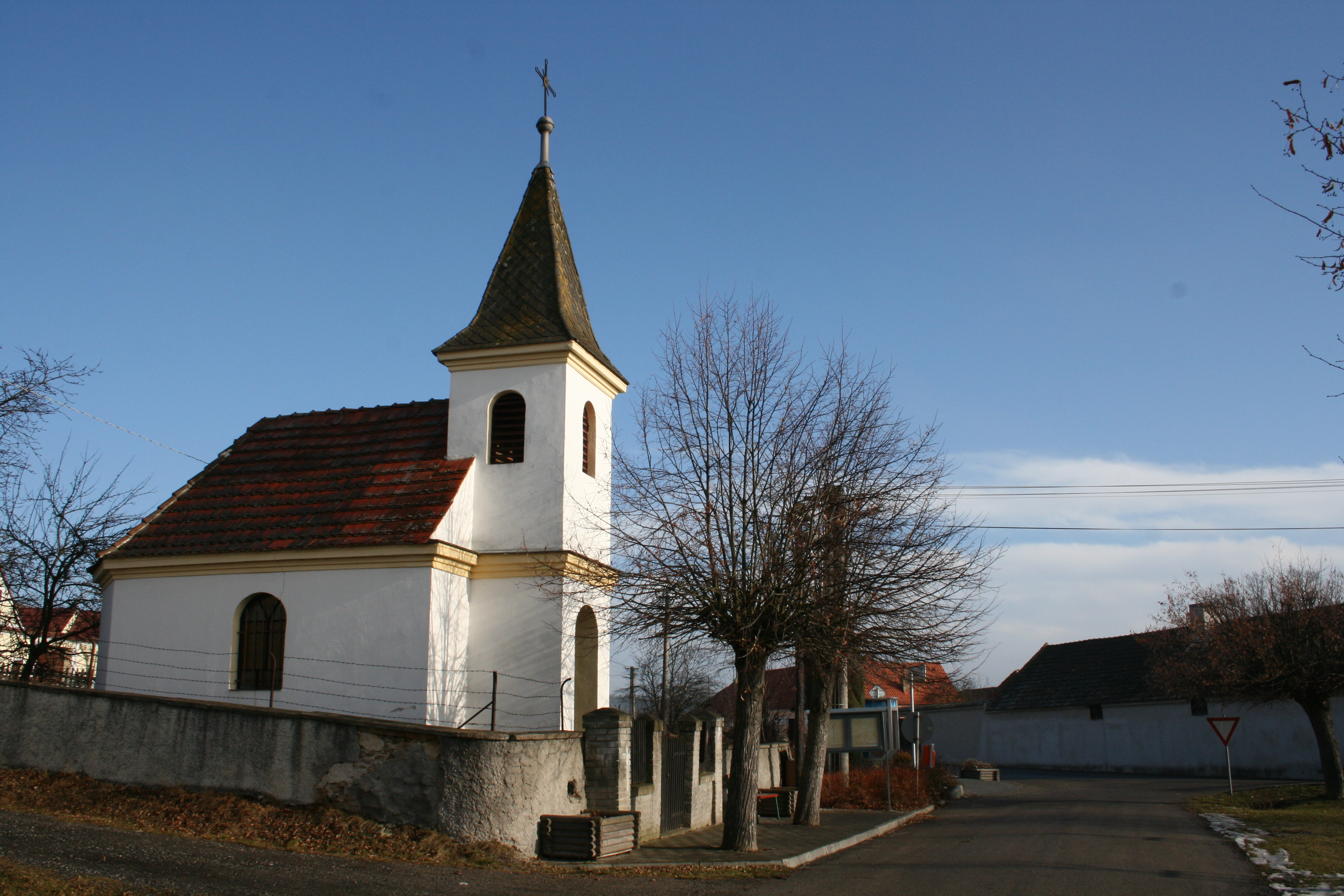
- Chapel of Saint Vitus

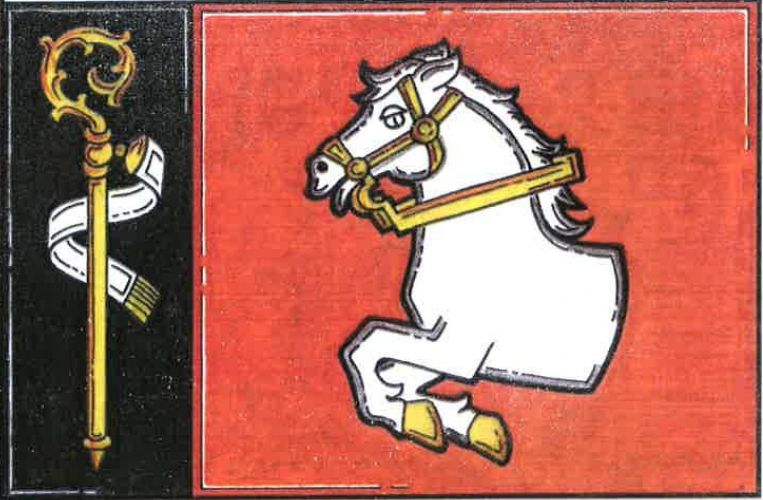
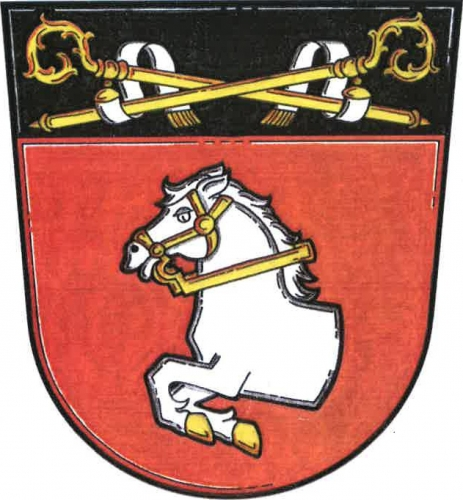
- Flag Coat of arms

- Location in the Czech Republic
- Coordinates: 49°12′57″N 14°30′4″E
- Country: Czech Republic
- Region: South Bohemian
- District: České Budějovice
- First mentioned: 1396

Area
  - Total: 4.40 km^{2} (1.70 sq mi)
- Elevation: 445 m (1,460 ft)

Population (2026-01-01)
  - Total: 106
  - Density: 24.1/km^{2} (62.4/sq mi)
- Time zone: UTC+1 (CET)
  - Summer (DST): UTC+2 (CEST)
- Postal code: 375 01
- Website: www.obecbecice.cz

Bečice is a municipality and village in České Budějovice District in the South Bohemian Region of the Czech Republic. It has about 100 inhabitants.

Bečice lies approximately 27 kilometres (17 mi) north of České Budějovice and 97 km (60 mi) south of Prague.

== Demographics ==
Historical population
Year	Pop.	±%
1869	347	—
1880	302	−13.0%
1890	277	−8.3%
1900	274	−1.1%
1910	268	−2.2%
1921	246	−8.2%
1930	233	−5.3%
1950	198	−15.0%
1961	195	−1.5%
1970	173	−11.3%
1980	144	−16.8%
1991	104	−27.8%
2001	109	+4.8%
2011	98	−10.1%
2021	111	+13.3%
Source: Censuses
