= Nedabyle =

- Municipality
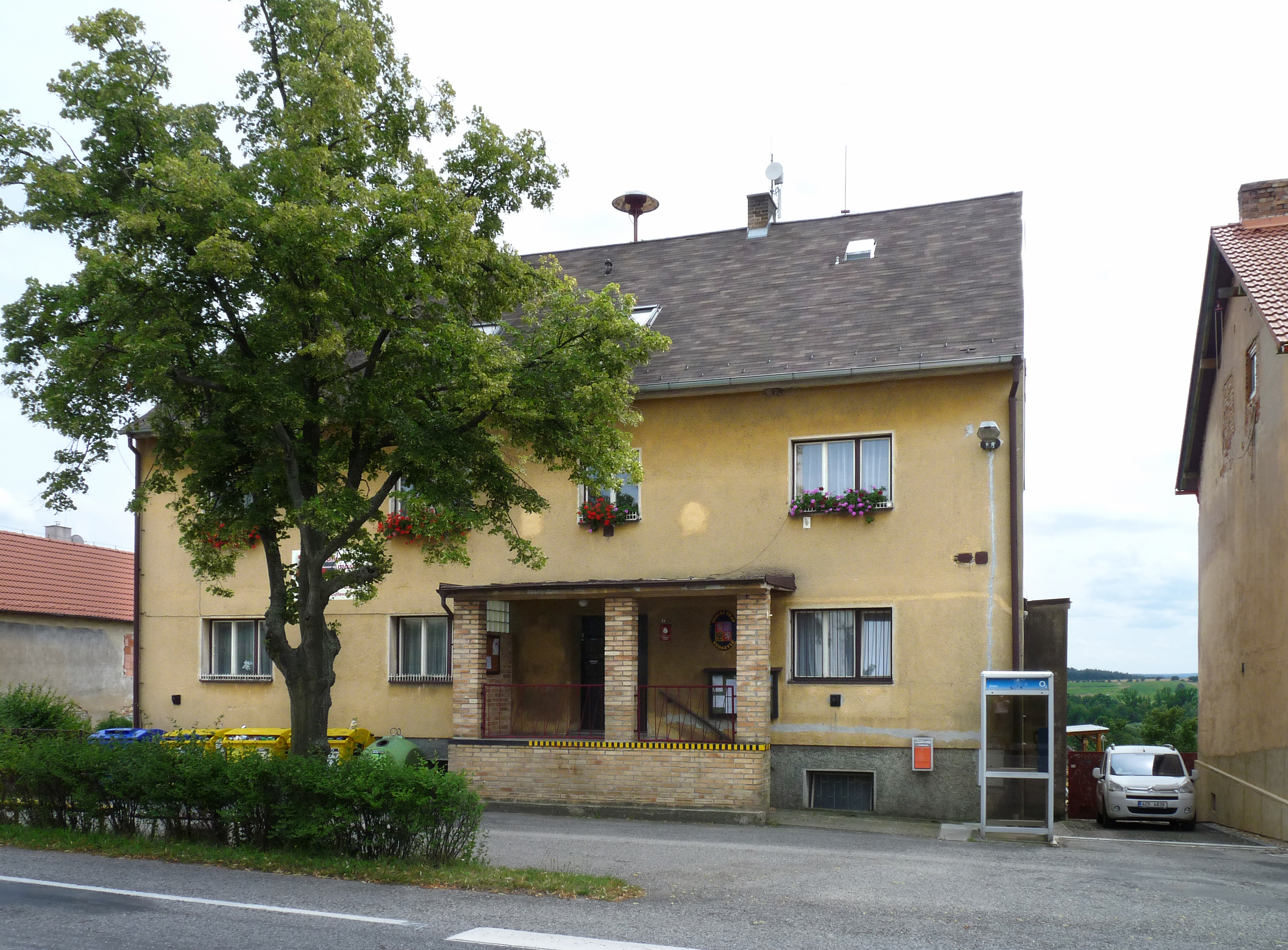
- Municipal office

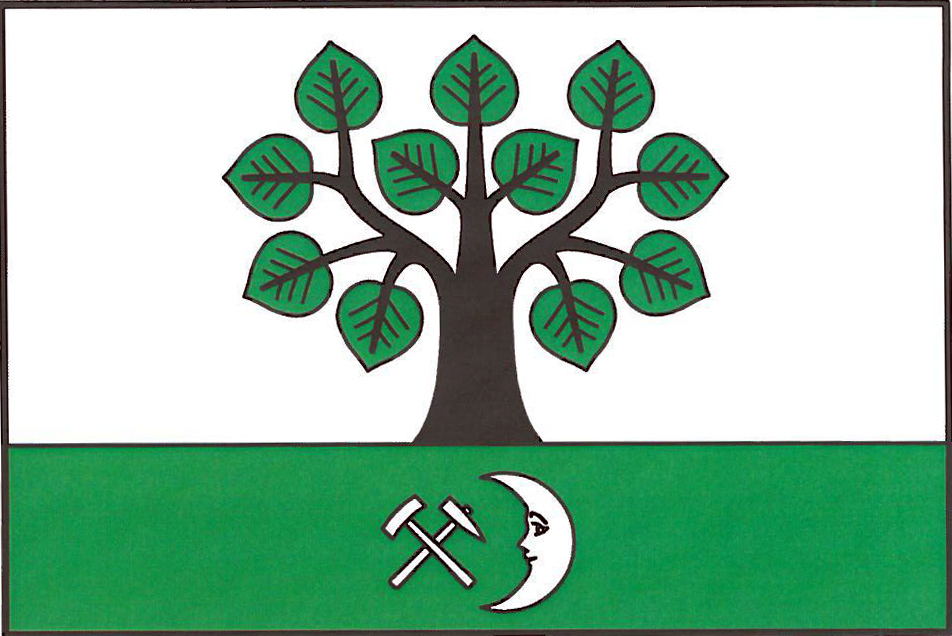
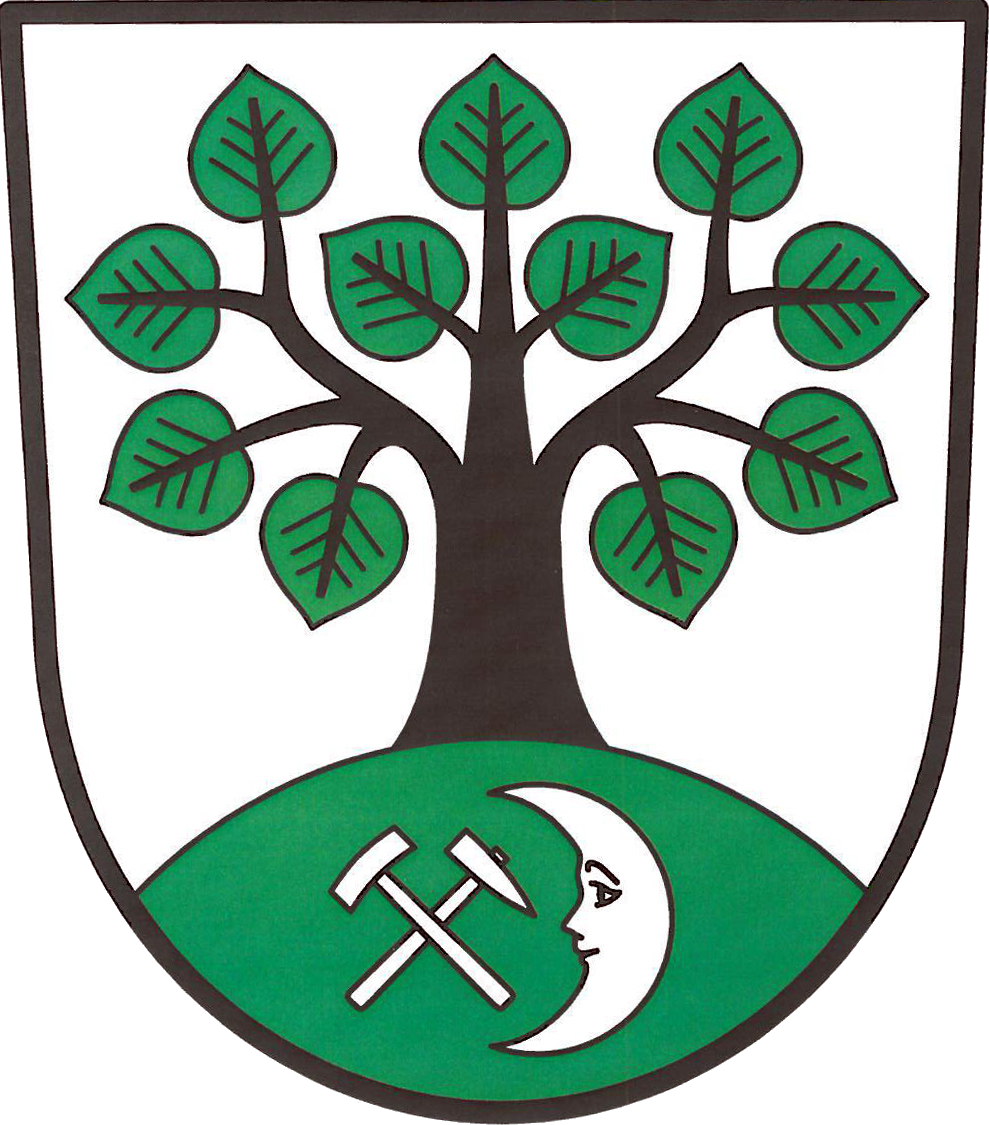
- Flag Coat of arms

- Location in the Czech Republic
- Coordinates: 48°55′43″N 14°30′54″E
- Country: Czech Republic
- Region: South Bohemian
- District: České Budějovice
- First mentioned: 1346

Area
  - Total: 2.38 km^{2} (0.92 sq mi)
- Elevation: 470 m (1,540 ft)

Population (2026-01-01)
  - Total: 376
  - Density: 158/km^{2} (409/sq mi)
- Time zone: UTC+1 (CET)
  - Summer (DST): UTC+2 (CEST)
- Postal codes: 370 06, 370 07, 370 08
- Website: www.nedabyle.cz

Nedabyle (German: Hables) is a municipality and village in České Budějovice District in the South Bohemian Region of the Czech Republic. It has about 400 inhabitants.

Nedabyle lies approximately 6 kilometres (4 mi) south-east of České Budějovice and 129 km (80 mi) south of Prague.

== Demographics ==
Historical population
Year	Pop.	±%
1869	168	—
1880	173	+3.0%
1890	262	+51.4%
1900	269	+2.7%
1910	271	+0.7%
1921	254	−6.3%
1930	204	−19.7%
1950	197	−3.4%
1961	229	+16.2%
1970	196	−14.4%
1980	202	+3.1%
1991	217	+7.4%
2001	235	+8.3%
2011	354	+50.6%
2021	364	+2.8%
Source: Censuses
