= Staré Hodějovice =

- Municipality
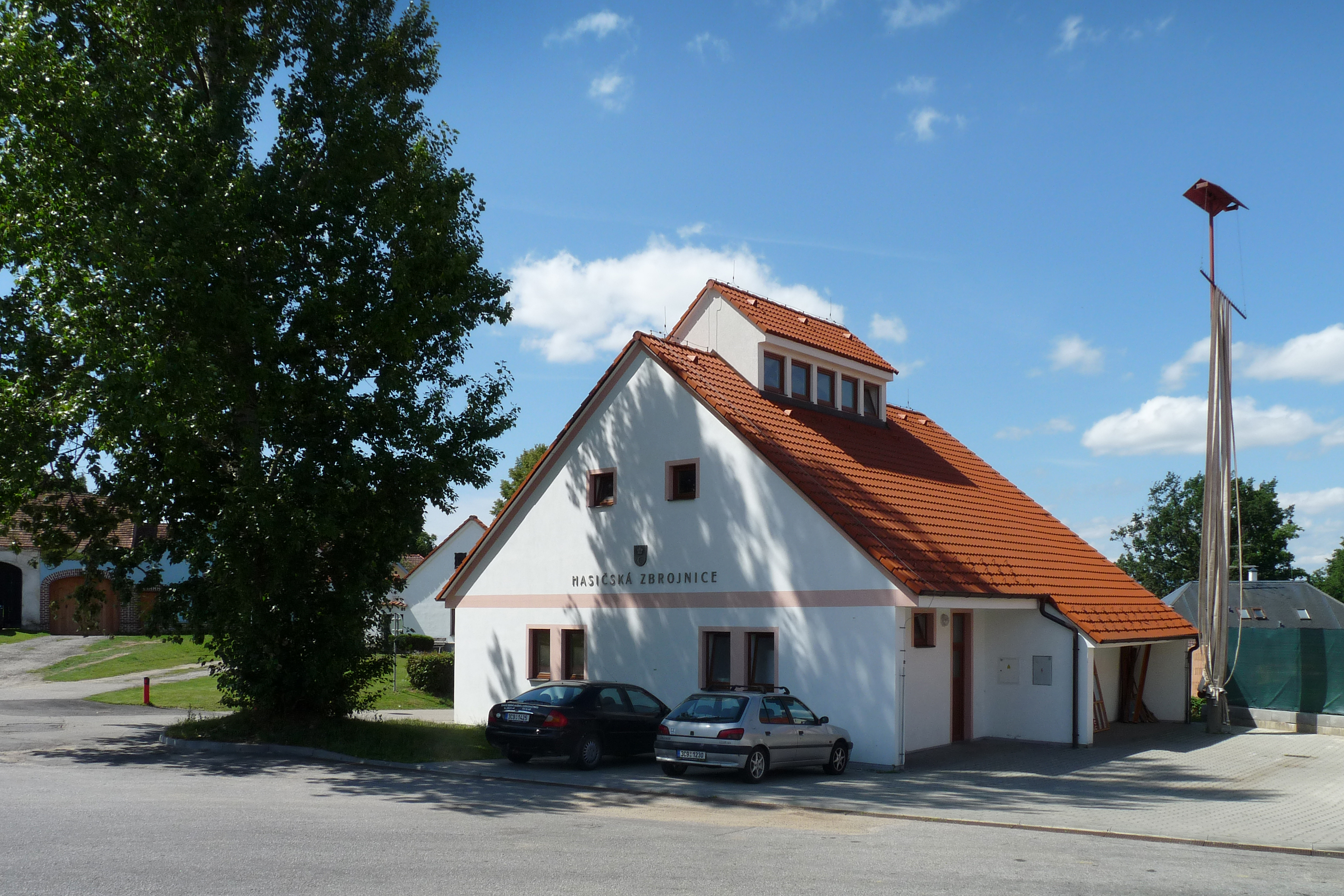
- Firehouse in Staré Hodějovice

- Coat of arms

- Location in the Czech Republic
- Coordinates: 48°56′44″N 14°31′16″E
- Country: Czech Republic
- Region: South Bohemian
- District: České Budějovice
- First mentioned: 1407

Area
  - Total: 5.08 km^{2} (1.96 sq mi)
- Elevation: 474 m (1,555 ft)

Population (2026-01-01)
  - Total: 1,370
  - Density: 270/km^{2} (698/sq mi)
- Time zone: UTC+1 (CET)
  - Summer (DST): UTC+2 (CEST)
- Postal codes: 370 06, 370 08
- Website: www.starehodejovice.cz

Staré Hodějovice is a municipality and village in České Budějovice District in the South Bohemian Region of the Czech Republic. It has about 1,400 inhabitants.

Staré Hodějovice lies approximately 5 kilometres (3 mi) south-east of České Budějovice and 127 km (79 mi) south of Prague.

== Demographics ==
Historical population
Year	Pop.	±%
1869	380	—
1880	399	+5.0%
1890	489	+22.6%
1900	452	−7.6%
1910	798	+76.5%
1921	998	+25.1%
1930	595	−40.4%
1950	577	−3.0%
1961	323	−44.0%
1970	417	+29.1%
1980	547	+31.2%
1991	630	+15.2%
2001	823	+30.6%
2011	1,065	+29.4%
2021	1,281	+20.3%
Source: Censuses
