= Horní Kněžeklady =

- Municipality
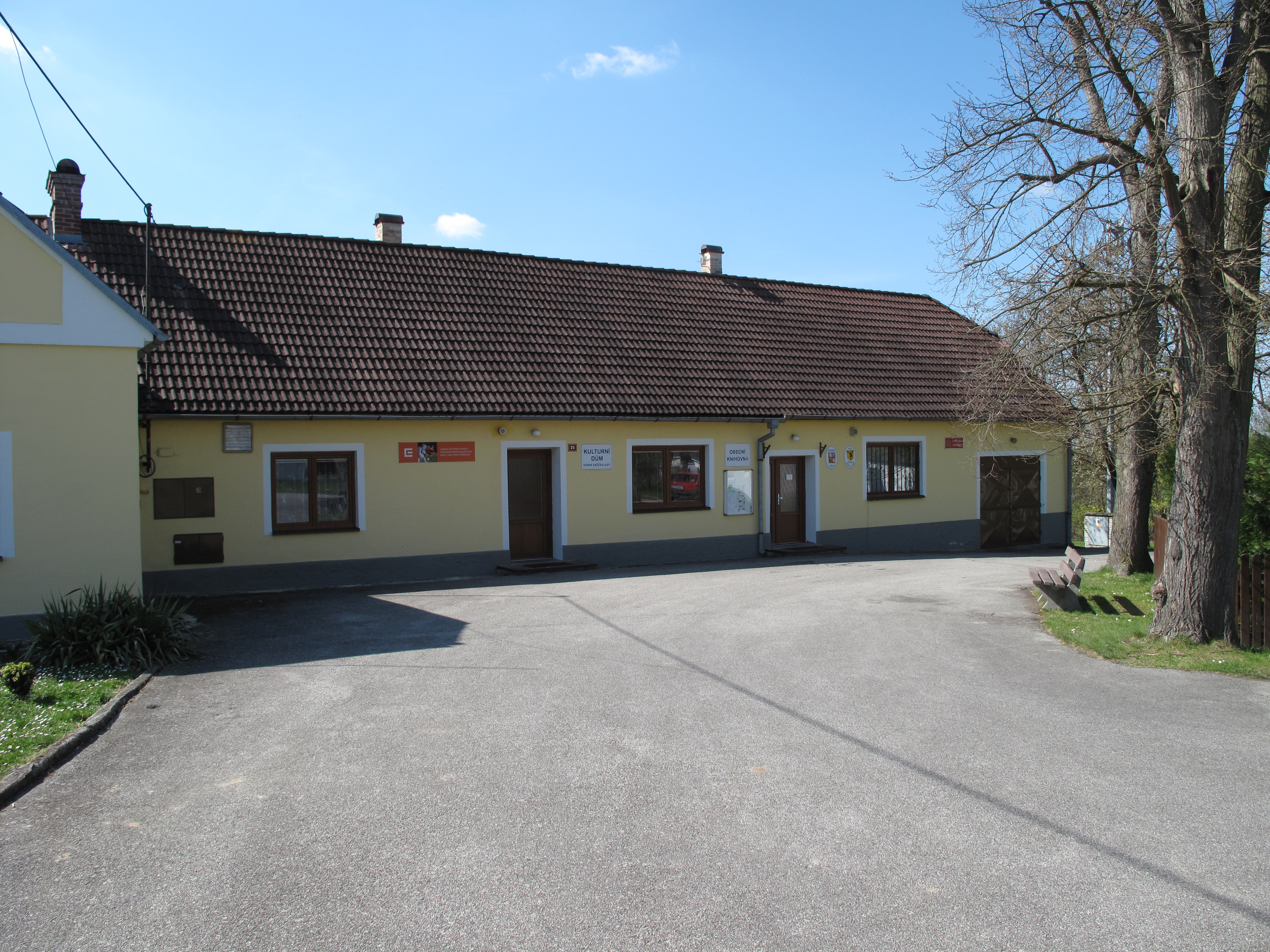
- Municipal office

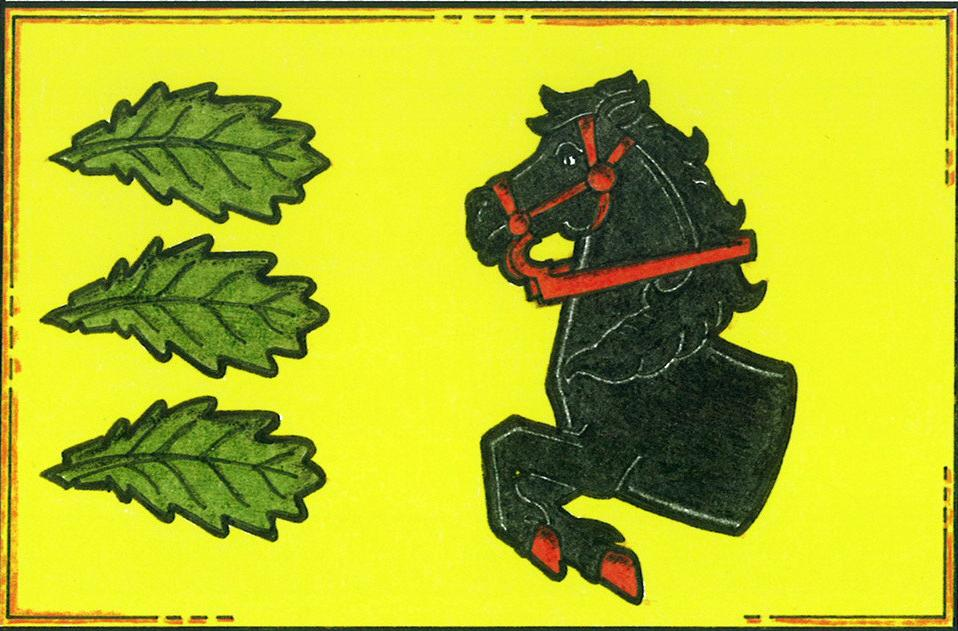
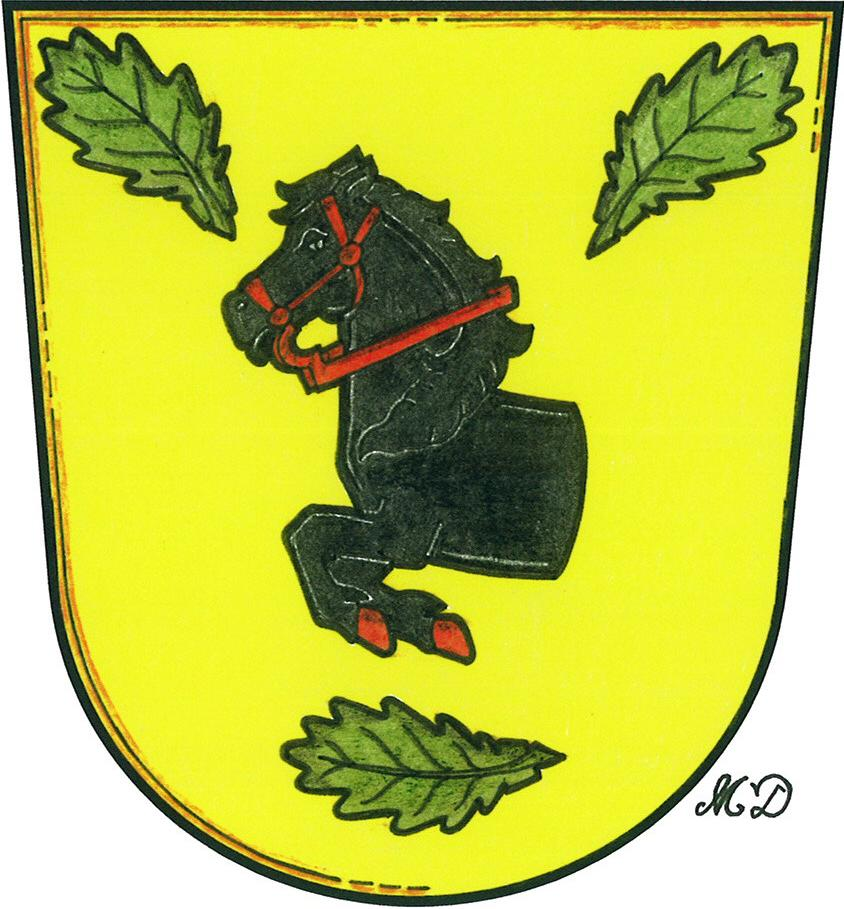
- Flag Coat of arms

- Location in the Czech Republic
- Coordinates: 49°11′38″N 14°28′53″E
- Country: Czech Republic
- Region: South Bohemian
- District: České Budějovice
- First mentioned: 1318

Area
  - Total: 7.85 km^{2} (3.03 sq mi)
- Elevation: 493 m (1,617 ft)

Population (2026-01-01)
  - Total: 115
  - Density: 14.6/km^{2} (37.9/sq mi)
- Time zone: UTC+1 (CET)
  - Summer (DST): UTC+2 (CEST)
- Postal code: 375 01
- Website: www.horniknezeklady.cz

Horní Kněžeklady is a municipality and village in České Budějovice District in the South Bohemian Region of the Czech Republic. It has about 100 inhabitants.

Horní Kněžeklady lies approximately 25 kilometres (16 mi) north of České Budějovice and 100 km (62 mi) south of Prague.

== Administrative division ==
Horní Kněžeklady consists of three municipal parts (in brackets population according to the 2021 census):

- Horní Kněžeklady (32)
- Dolní Kněžeklady (32)
- Štipoklasy (45)

== Demographics ==
Historical population
Year	Pop.	±%
1869	344	—
1880	386	+12.2%
1890	383	−0.8%
1900	367	−4.2%
1910	380	+3.5%
1921	385	+1.3%
1930	355	−7.8%
1950	272	−23.4%
1961	261	−4.0%
1970	254	−2.7%
1980	192	−24.4%
1991	140	−27.1%
2001	112	−20.0%
2011	104	−7.1%
2021	109	+4.8%
Source: Censuses
