= Kvítkovice =

- Municipality
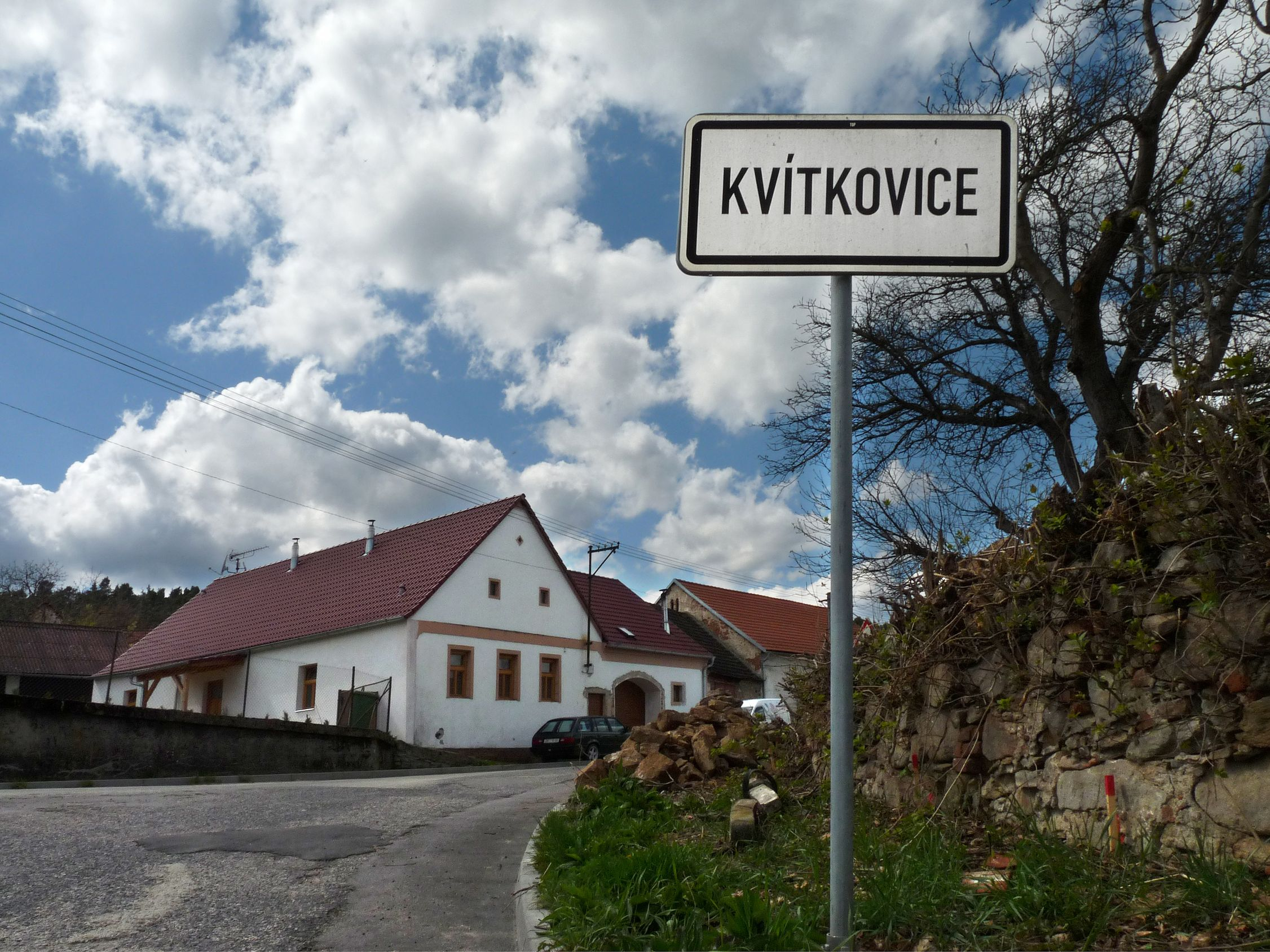
- Entrance to Kvítkovice

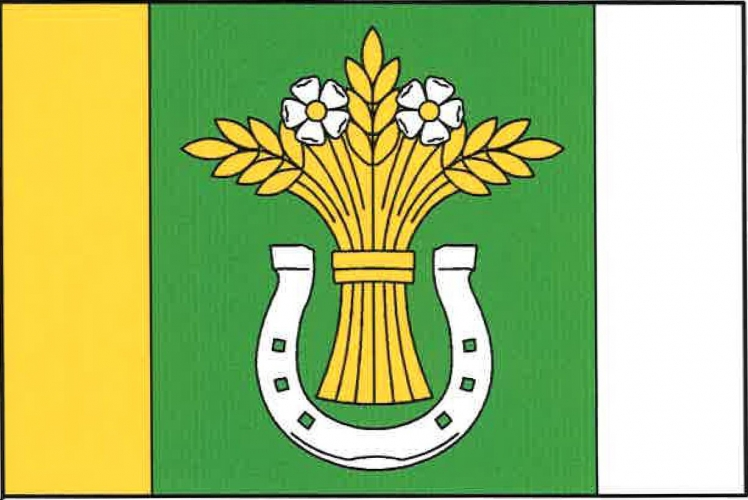
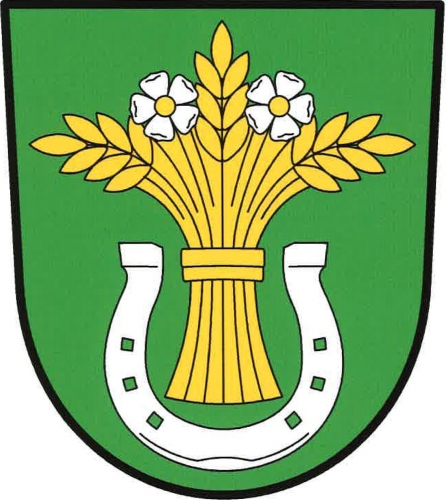
- Flag Coat of arms

- Location in the Czech Republic
- Coordinates: 48°57′27″N 14°19′52″E
- Country: Czech Republic
- Region: South Bohemian
- District: České Budějovice
- First mentioned: 1263

Area
  - Total: 3.94 km^{2} (1.52 sq mi)
- Elevation: 448 m (1,470 ft)

Population (2026-01-01)
  - Total: 135
  - Density: 34.3/km^{2} (88.7/sq mi)
- Time zone: UTC+1 (CET)
  - Summer (DST): UTC+2 (CEST)
- Postal code: 373 84
- Website: www.kvitkovice.cz

Kvítkovice is a municipality and village in České Budějovice District in the South Bohemian Region of the Czech Republic. It has about 100 inhabitants.

Kvítkovice lies approximately 11 kilometres (7 mi) west of České Budějovice and 126 km (78 mi) south of Prague.

== Demographics ==
Historical population
Year	Pop.	±%
1869	224	—
1880	224	+0.0%
1890	204	−8.9%
1900	176	−13.7%
1910	154	−12.5%
1921	168	+9.1%
1930	148	−11.9%
1950	115	−22.3%
1961	119	+3.5%
1970	101	−15.1%
1980	90	−10.9%
1991	84	−6.7%
2001	82	−2.4%
2011	109	+32.9%
2021	133	+22.0%
Source: Censuses
