= Mazelov =

- Municipality
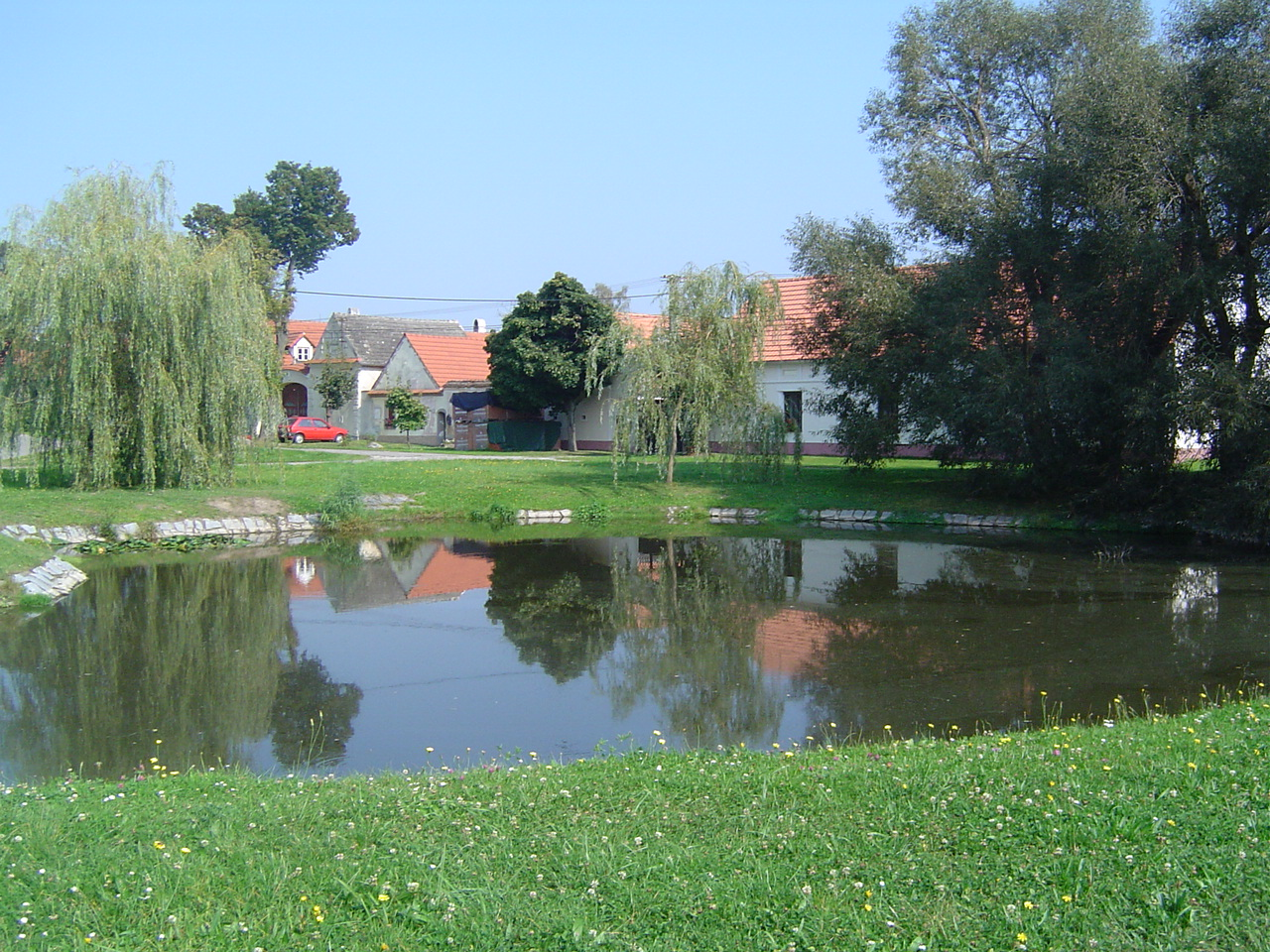
- Centre of Mazelov

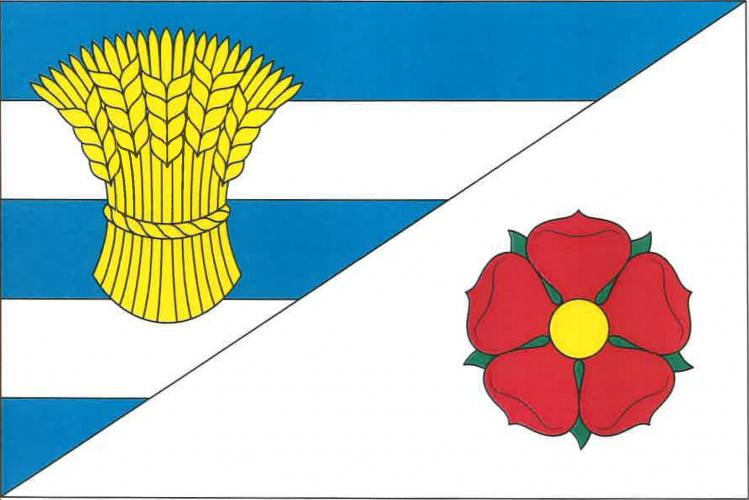
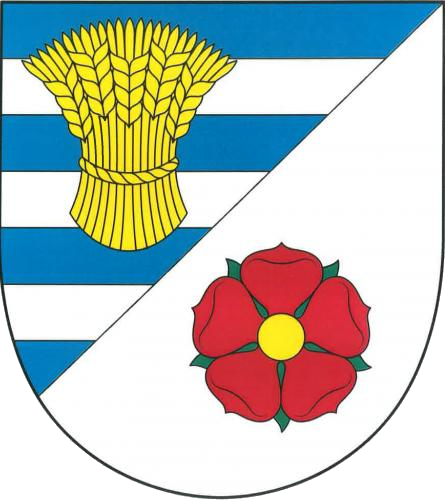
- Flag Coat of arms

- Location in the Czech Republic
- Coordinates: 49°6′11″N 14°37′4″E
- Country: Czech Republic
- Region: South Bohemian
- District: České Budějovice
- First mentioned: 1396

Area
  - Total: 8.63 km^{2} (3.33 sq mi)
- Elevation: 438 m (1,437 ft)

Population (2026-01-01)
  - Total: 235
  - Density: 27.2/km^{2} (70.5/sq mi)
- Time zone: UTC+1 (CET)
  - Summer (DST): UTC+2 (CEST)
- Postal code: 373 63
- Website: www.mazelov.cz

Mazelov is a municipality and village in České Budějovice District in the South Bohemian Region of the Czech Republic. It has about 200 inhabitants. The village is well preserved and is protected as a village monument reservation.

Mazelov lies approximately 18 kilometres (11 mi) north-east of České Budějovice and 111 km (69 mi) south of Prague.

== Demographics ==
Historical population
Year	Pop.	±%
1869	383	—
1880	383	+0.0%
1890	382	−0.3%
1900	416	+8.9%
1910	402	−3.4%
1921	380	−5.5%
1930	392	+3.2%
1950	292	−25.5%
1961	290	−0.7%
1970	258	−11.0%
1980	244	−5.4%
1991	211	−13.5%
2001	211	+0.0%
2011	198	−6.2%
2021	213	+7.6%
Source: Censuses
