= Nákří =

- Municipality
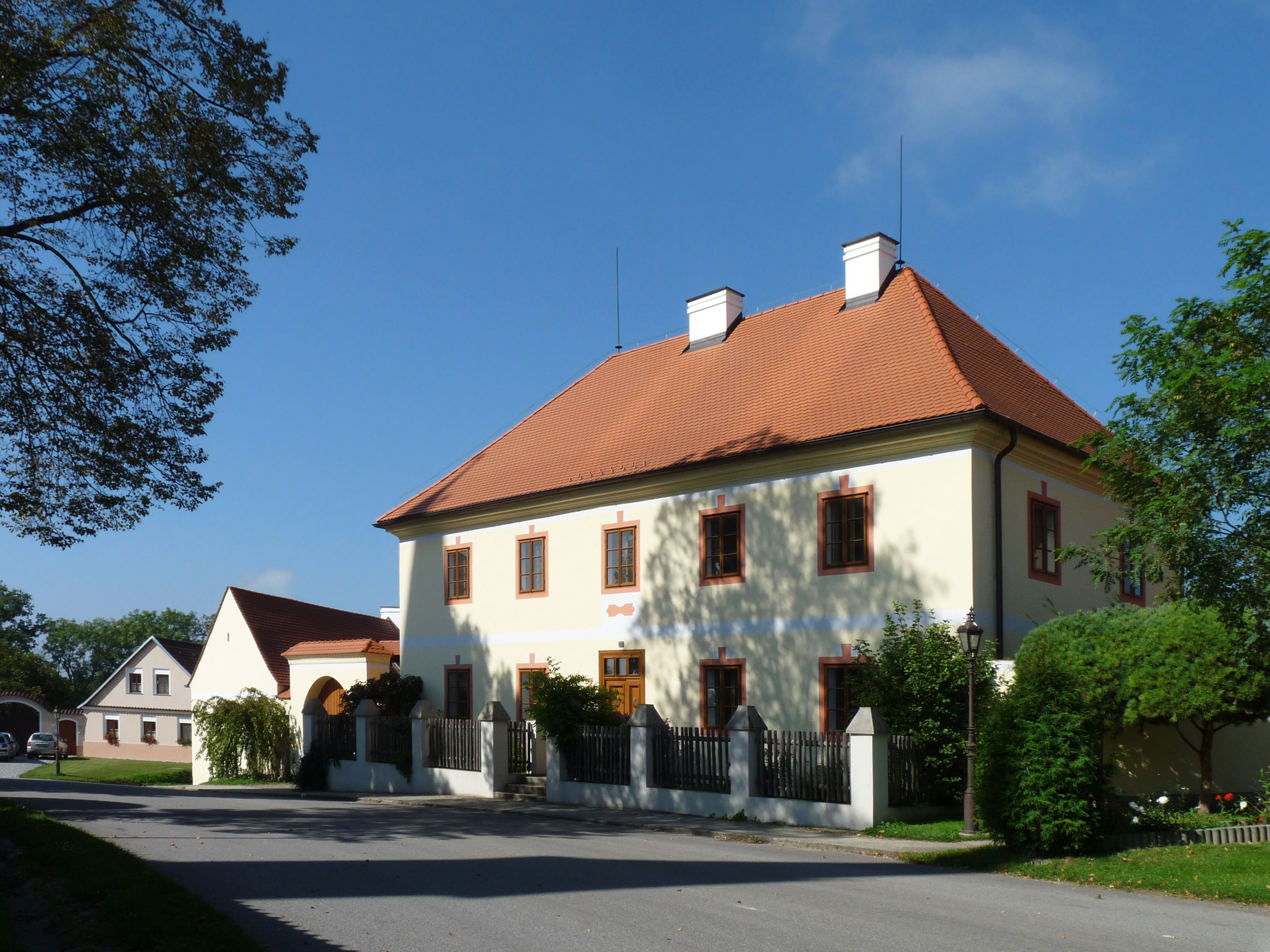
- Rectory

- Flag Coat of arms

- Location in the Czech Republic
- Coordinates: 49°7′8″N 14°19′46″E
- Country: Czech Republic
- Region: South Bohemian
- District: České Budějovice
- First mentioned: 1357

Area
  - Total: 6.69 km^{2} (2.58 sq mi)
- Elevation: 407 m (1,335 ft)

Population (2026-01-01)
  - Total: 226
  - Density: 33.8/km^{2} (87.5/sq mi)
- Time zone: UTC+1 (CET)
  - Summer (DST): UTC+2 (CEST)
- Postal code: 373 48
- Website: www.nakri.cz

Nákří is a municipality and village in České Budějovice District in the South Bohemian Region of the Czech Republic. It has about 200 inhabitants.

Nákří lies approximately 20 kilometres (12 mi) north-west of České Budějovice and 108 km (67 mi) south of Prague.

== Demographics ==
Historical population
Year	Pop.	±%
1869	300	—
1880	338	+12.7%
1890	337	−0.3%
1900	315	−6.5%
1910	347	+10.2%
1921	374	+7.8%
1930	371	−0.8%
1950	341	−8.1%
1961	332	−2.6%
1970	300	−9.6%
1980	246	−18.0%
1991	204	−17.1%
2001	201	−1.5%
2011	209	+4.0%
2021	209	+0.0%
Source: Censuses
