= Ločenice =

- Municipality
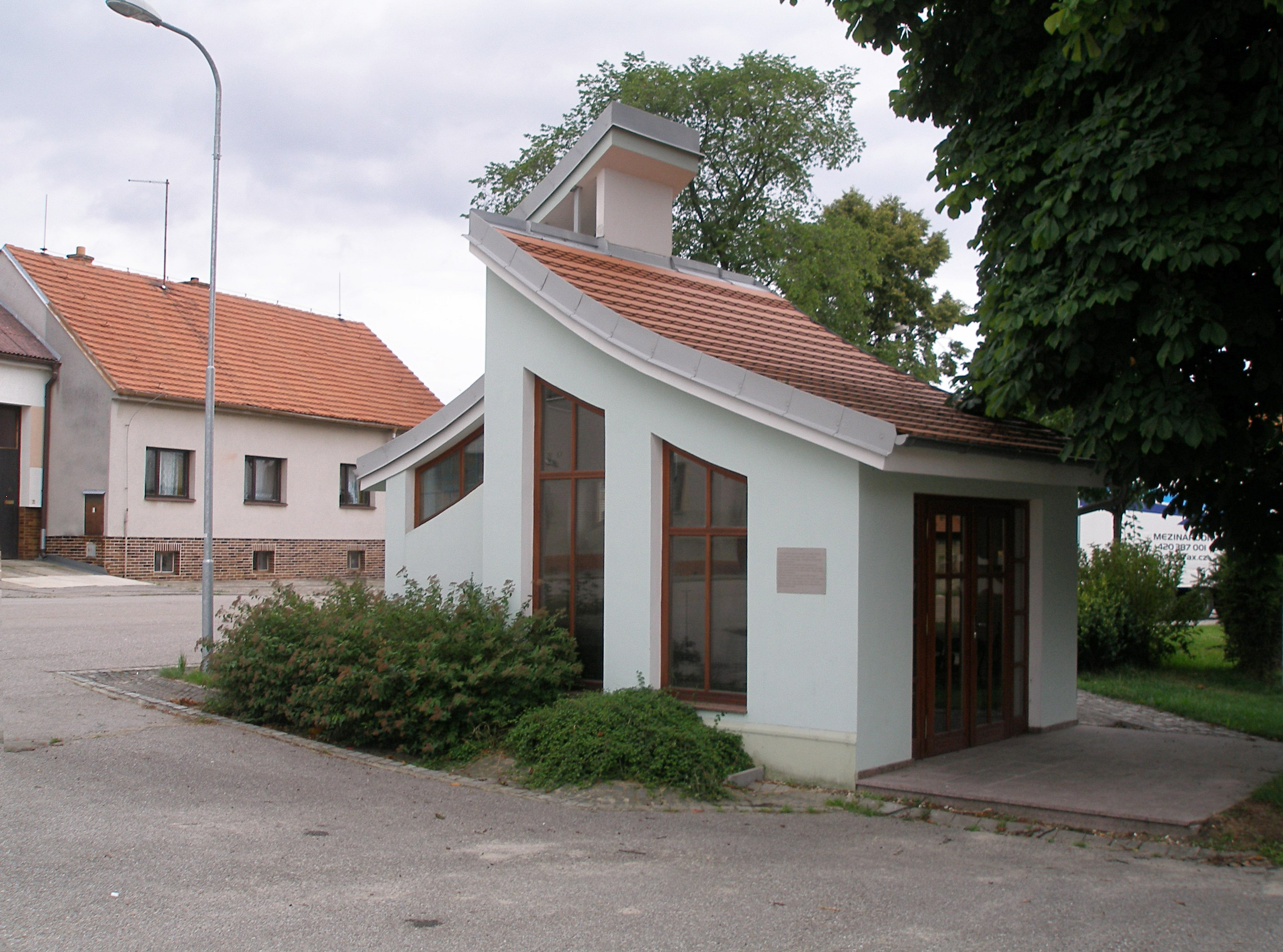
- Chapel of Saint Agnes of Bohemia

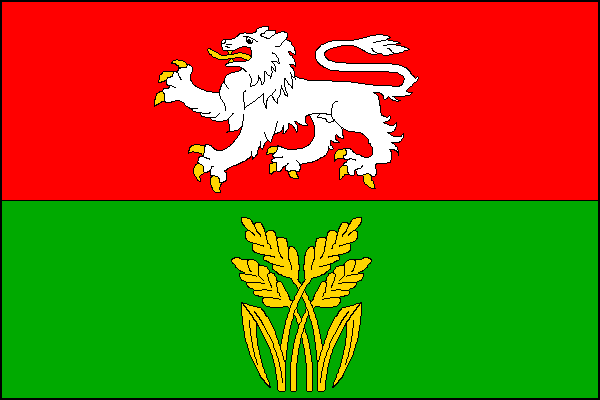
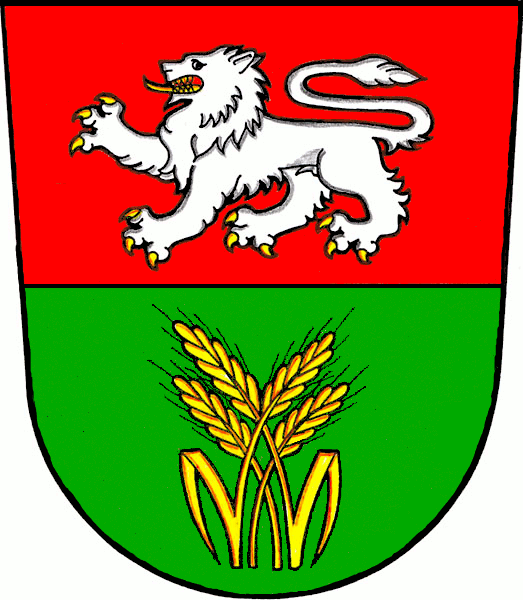
- Flag Coat of arms

- Location in the Czech Republic
- Coordinates: 48°49′27″N 14°31′39″E
- Country: Czech Republic
- Region: South Bohemian
- District: České Budějovice
- First mentioned: 1360

Area
  - Total: 15.87 km^{2} (6.13 sq mi)
- Elevation: 570 m (1,870 ft)

Population (2026-01-01)
  - Total: 780
  - Density: 49/km^{2} (130/sq mi)
- Time zone: UTC+1 (CET)
  - Summer (DST): UTC+2 (CEST)
- Postal codes: 373 22, 374 01
- Website: www.locenice.cz

Ločenice is a municipality and village in České Budějovice District in the South Bohemian Region of the Czech Republic. It has about 800 inhabitants.

Ločenice lies approximately 18 kilometres (11 mi) south of České Budějovice and 141 km (88 mi) south of Prague.

== Administrative division ==
Ločenice consists of two municipal parts (in brackets population according to the 2021 census):

- Ločenice (565)
- Nesměň (163)

== Demographics ==
Historical population
| Year | Pop. | ±% |
|---|---|---|
| 1869 | 965 | — |
| 1880 | 1,029 | +6.6% |
| 1890 | 1,132 | +10.0% |
| 1900 | 1,184 | +4.6% |
| 1910 | 1,191 | +0.6% |
| 1921 | 1,174 | −1.4% |
| 1930 | 997 | −15.1% |
| 1950 | 768 | −23.0% |
| 1961 | 734 | −4.4% |
| 1970 | 620 | −15.5% |
| 1980 | 647 | +4.4% |
| 1991 | 570 | −11.9% |
| 2001 | 576 | +1.1% |
| 2011 | 616 | +6.9% |
| 2021 | 728 | +18.2% |
Source: Censuses
