= Drahotěšice =

- Municipality
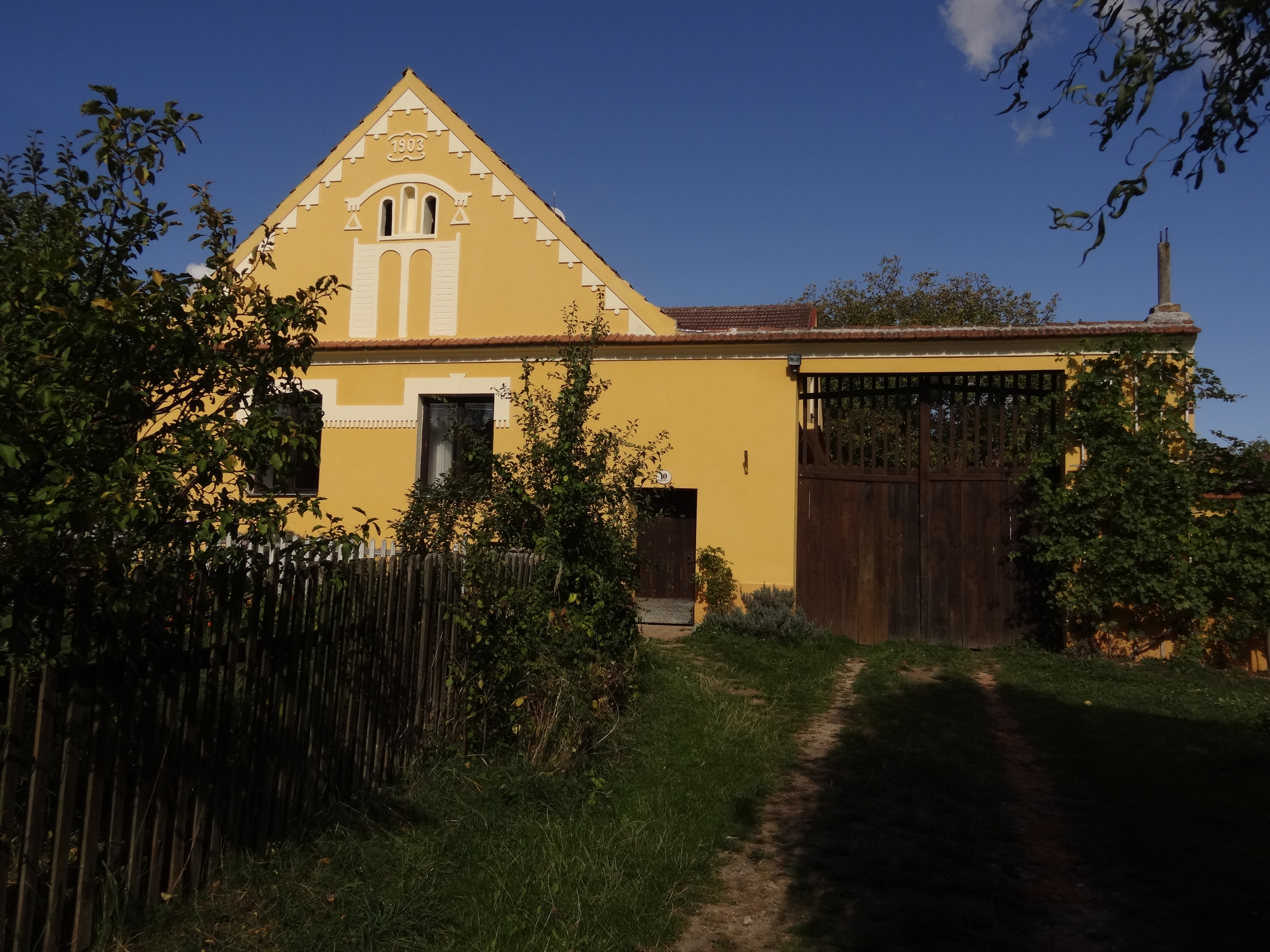
- A farmstead in Drahotěšice

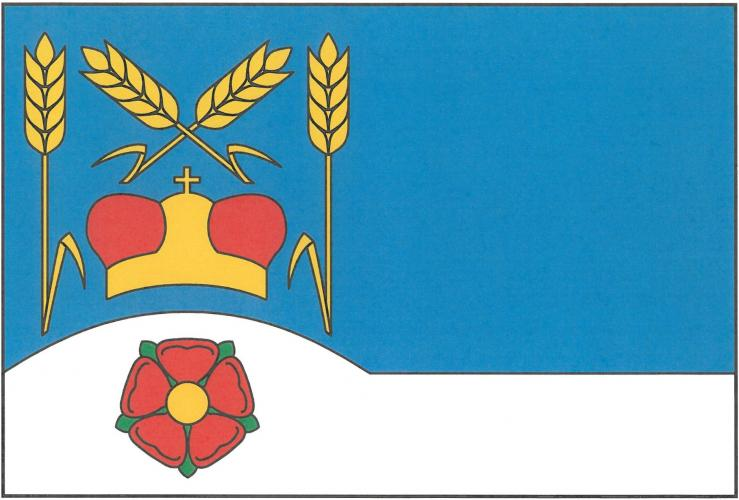
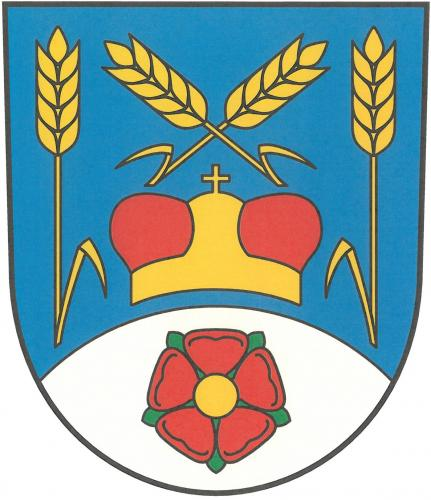
- Flag Coat of arms

- Location in the Czech Republic
- Coordinates: 49°7′28″N 14°32′48″E
- Country: Czech Republic
- Region: South Bohemian
- District: České Budějovice
- First mentioned: 1323

Area
  - Total: 7.15 km^{2} (2.76 sq mi)
- Elevation: 521 m (1,709 ft)

Population (2026-01-01)
  - Total: 335
  - Density: 46.9/km^{2} (121/sq mi)
- Time zone: UTC+1 (CET)
  - Summer (DST): UTC+2 (CEST)
- Postal code: 373 63
- Website: www.drahotesice.cz

Drahotěšice is a municipality and village in České Budějovice District in the South Bohemian Region of the Czech Republic. It has about 300 inhabitants.

Drahotěšice lies approximately 18 kilometres (11 mi) north of České Budějovice and 108 km (67 mi) south of Prague.

== Demographics ==
Historical population
Year	Pop.	±%
1869	556	—
1880	596	+7.2%
1890	533	−10.6%
1900	558	+4.7%
1910	593	+6.3%
1921	594	+0.2%
1930	591	−0.5%
1950	421	−28.8%
1961	414	−1.7%
1970	306	−26.1%
1980	249	−18.6%
1991	198	−20.5%
2001	208	+5.1%
2011	279	+34.1%
2021	309	+10.8%
Source: Censuses
