= Bošilec =

- Municipality
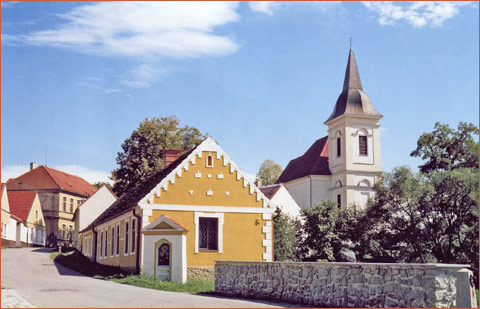
- Church of Saint Martin

- Location in the Czech Republic
- Coordinates: 49°8′58″N 14°38′46″E
- Country: Czech Republic
- Region: South Bohemian
- District: České Budějovice
- First mentioned: 1318

Area
  - Total: 9.58 km^{2} (3.70 sq mi)
- Elevation: 419 m (1,375 ft)

Population (2026-01-01)
  - Total: 226
  - Density: 23.6/km^{2} (61.1/sq mi)
- Time zone: UTC+1 (CET)
  - Summer (DST): UTC+2 (CEST)
- Postal code: 373 65
- Website: www.bosilec.cz

Bošilec is a municipality and village in České Budějovice District in the South Bohemian Region of the Czech Republic. It has about 200 inhabitants.

Bošilec lies approximately 24 kilometres (15 mi) north-east of České Budějovice and 106 km (66 mi) south of Prague.

== History ==
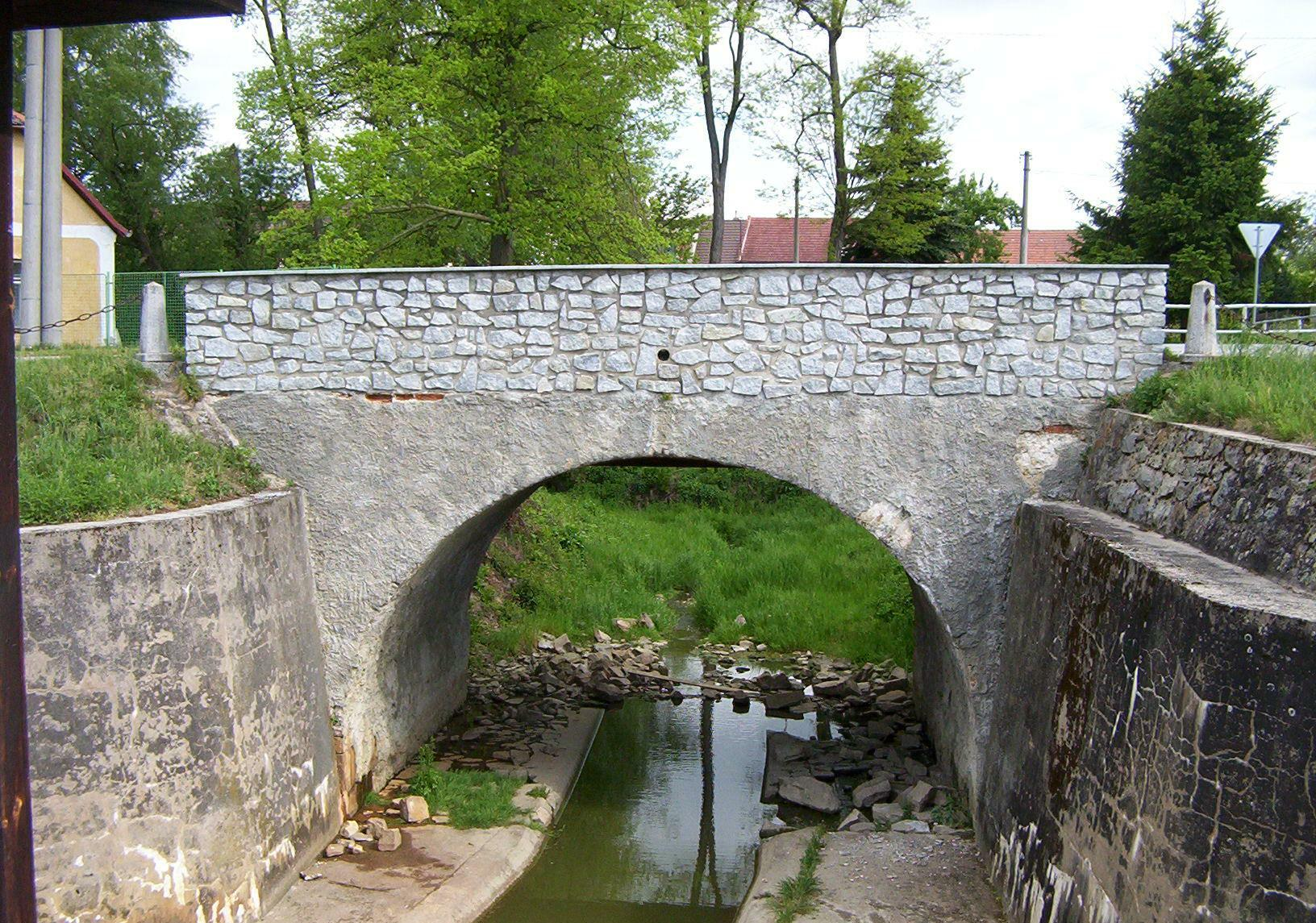
Bošilec Bridge

The first written mention of Bošilec is from 1318.

== Demographics ==
Historical population
Year	Pop.	±%
1869	459	—
1880	489	+6.5%
1890	460	−5.9%
1900	458	−0.4%
1910	465	+1.5%
1921	438	−5.8%
1930	461	+5.3%
1950	299	−35.1%
1961	317	+6.0%
1970	280	−11.7%
1980	267	−4.6%
1991	217	−18.7%
2001	192	−11.5%
2011	191	−0.5%
2021	213	+11.5%
Source: Censuses
