= Kamenná (České Budějovice District) =

- Municipality
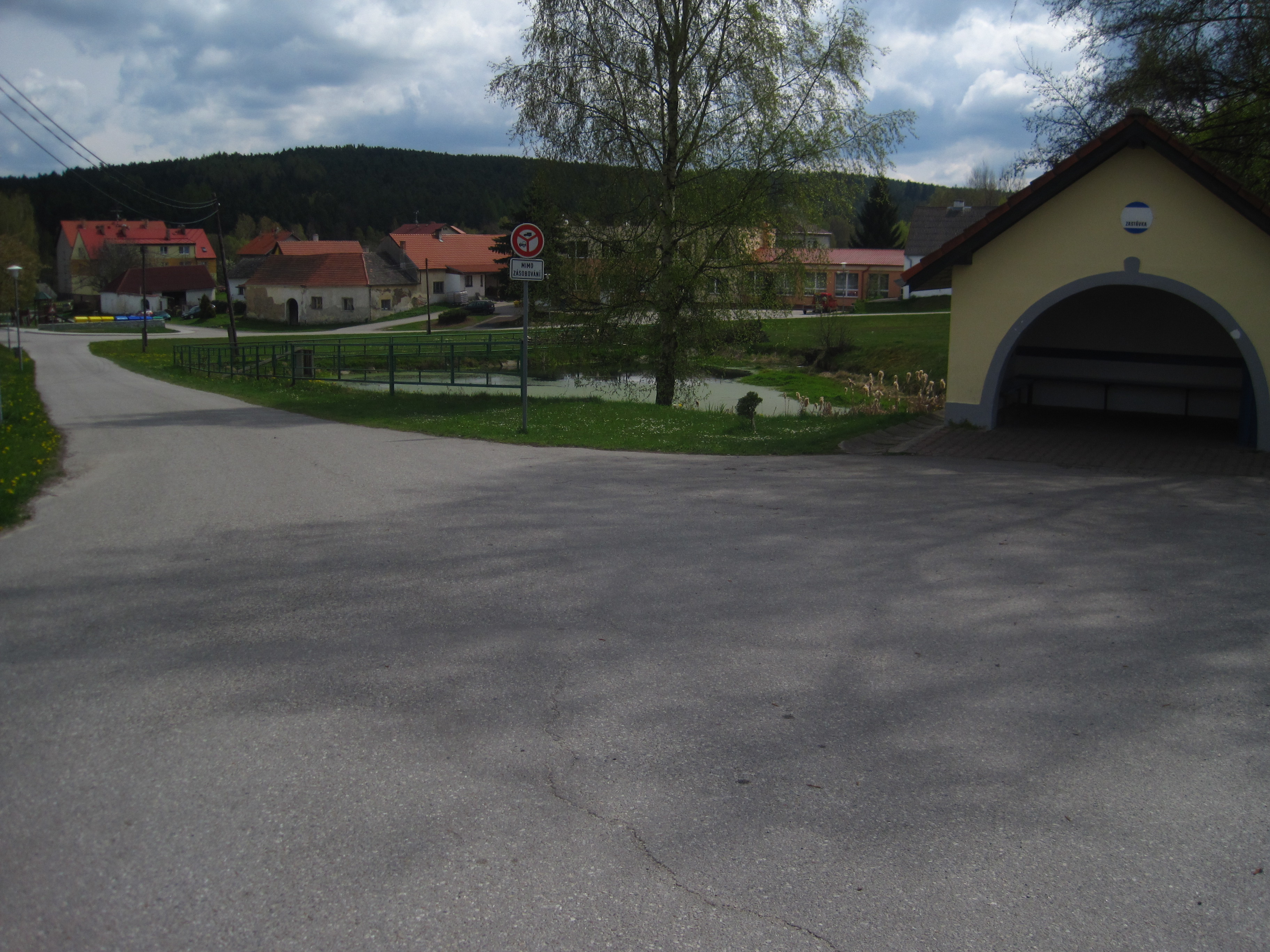
- Centre of Kamenná

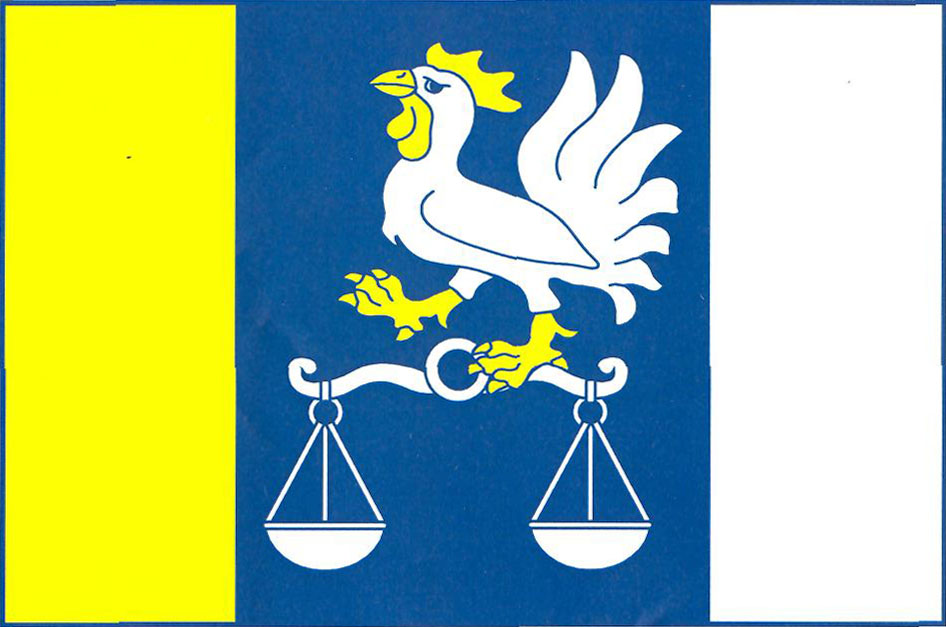
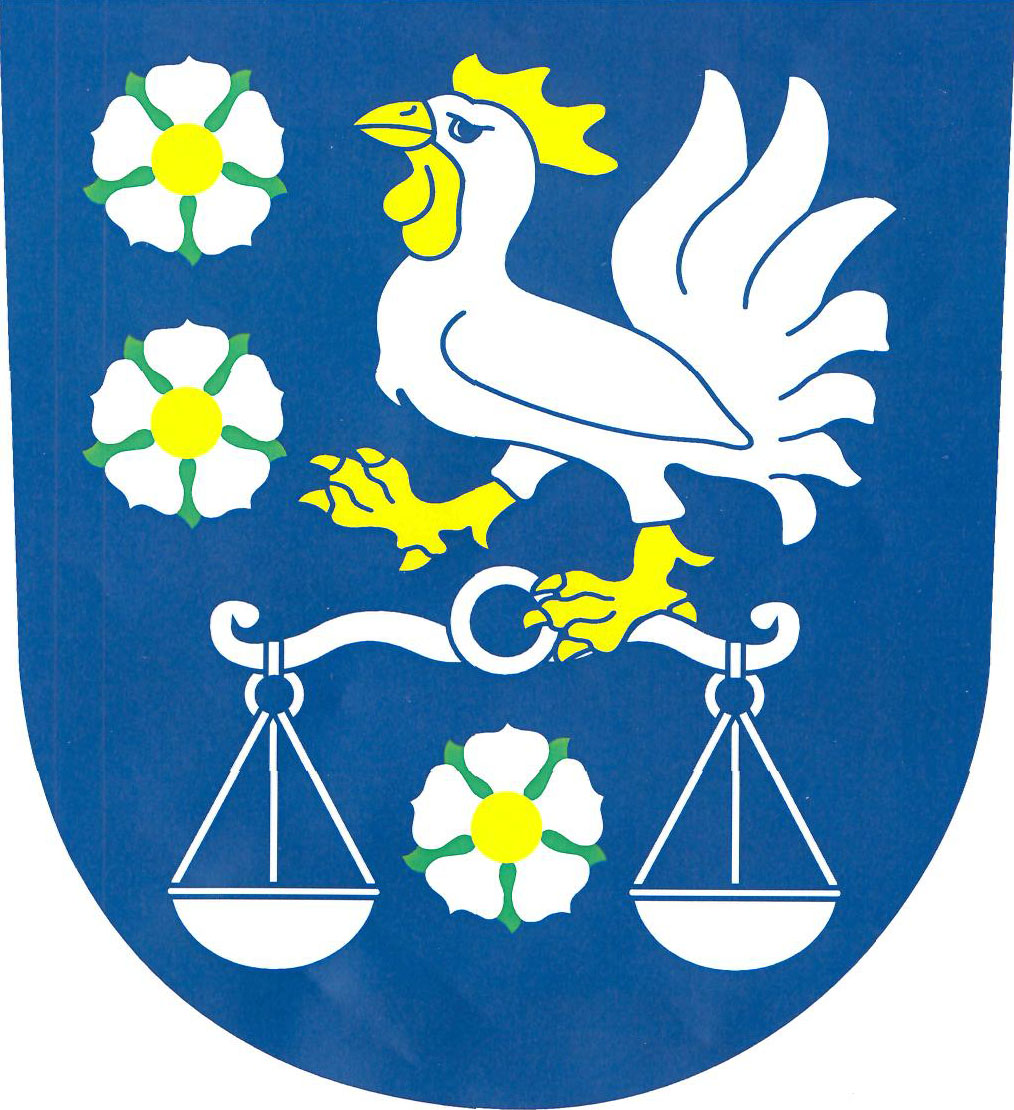
- Flag Coat of arms

- Location in the Czech Republic
- Coordinates: 48°46′47″N 14°40′16″E
- Country: Czech Republic
- Region: South Bohemian
- District: České Budějovice
- First mentioned: 1349

Area
  - Total: 12.63 km^{2} (4.88 sq mi)
- Elevation: 560 m (1,840 ft)

Population (2026-01-01)
  - Total: 341
  - Density: 27.0/km^{2} (69.9/sq mi)
- Time zone: UTC+1 (CET)
  - Summer (DST): UTC+2 (CEST)
- Postal code: 374 01
- Website: www.oukamenna.cz

Kamenná (German: Sacherles) is a municipality and village in České Budějovice District in the South Bohemian Region of the Czech Republic. It has about 300 inhabitants.

Kamenná lies approximately 26 kilometres (16 mi) south-east of České Budějovice and 147 km (91 mi) south of Prague.

== Administrative division ==
Kamenná consists of three municipal parts (in brackets population according to the 2021 census):

- Kamenná (222)
- Klažary (20)
- Kondrač (70)

== Demographics ==
Historical population
Year	Pop.	±%
1869	774	—
1880	840	+8.5%
1890	777	−7.5%
1900	787	+1.3%
1910	784	−0.4%
1921	782	−0.3%
1930	720	−7.9%
1950	344	−52.2%
1961	350	+1.7%
1970	327	−6.6%
1980	267	−18.3%
1991	252	−5.6%
2001	264	+4.8%
2011	297	+12.5%
2021	312	+5.1%
Source: Censuses
