= Hranice (České Budějovice District) =

- Municipality
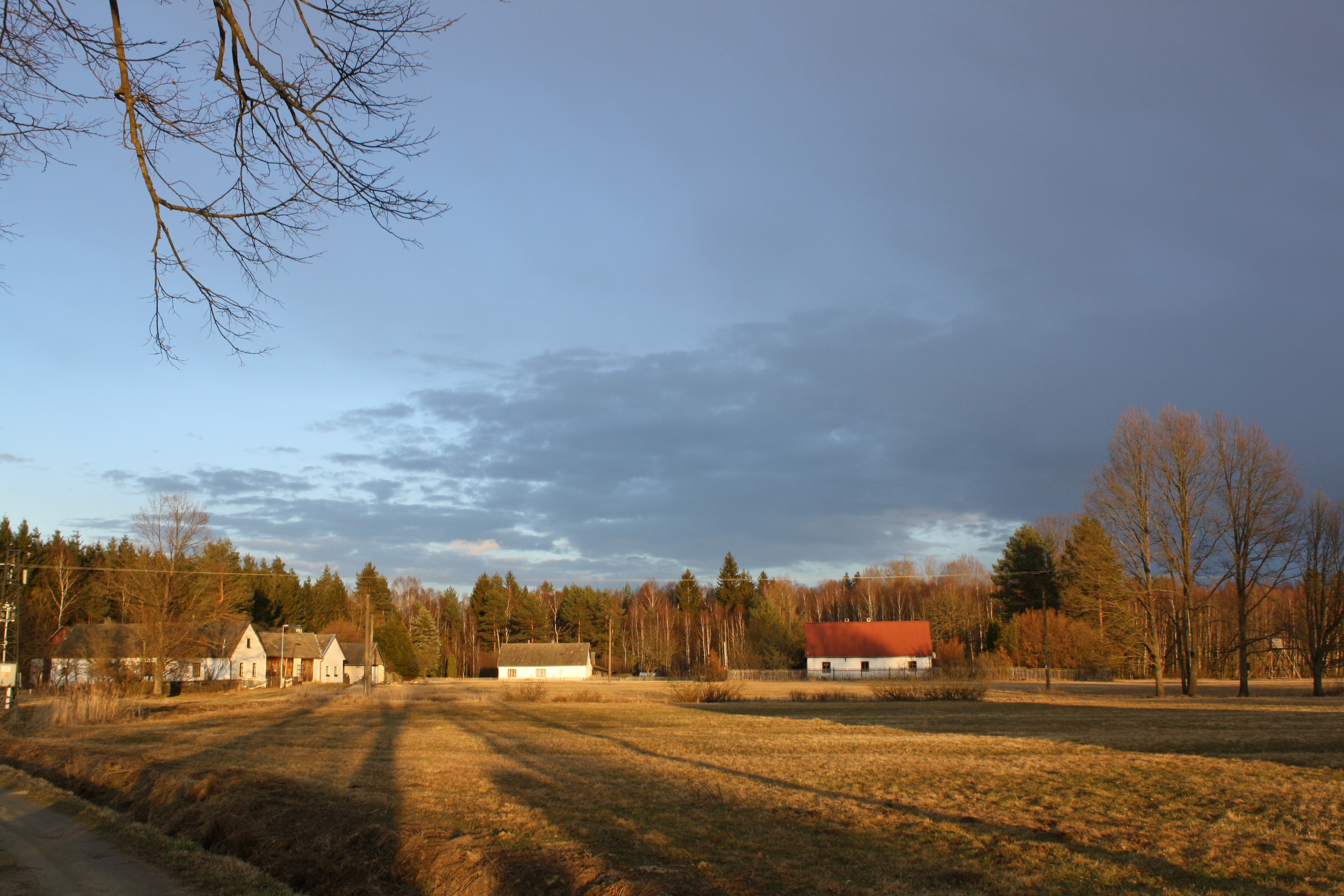
- Blata, a locality in Hranice

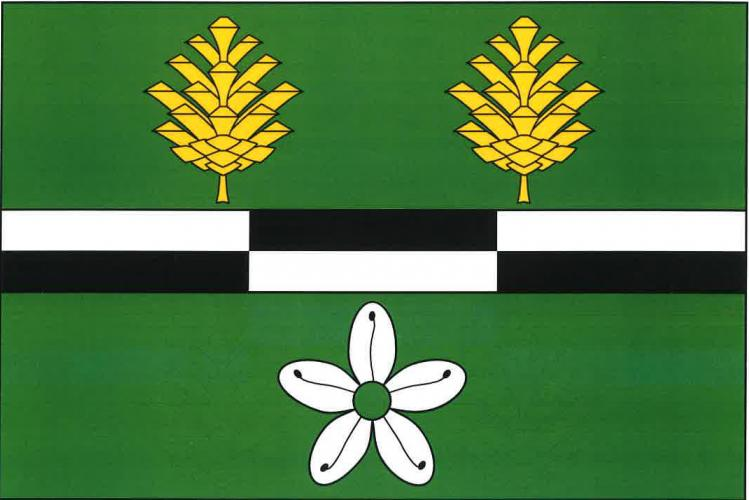
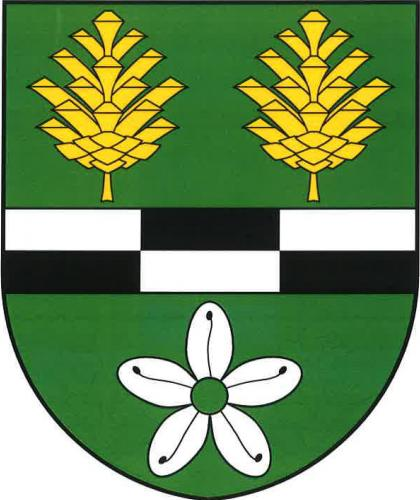
- Flag Coat of arms

- Location in the Czech Republic
- Coordinates: 48°50′19″N 14°52′6″E
- Country: Czech Republic
- Region: South Bohemian
- District: České Budějovice
- Founded: 1790

Area
  - Total: 7.22 km^{2} (2.79 sq mi)
- Elevation: 480 m (1,570 ft)

Population (2026-01-01)
  - Total: 213
  - Density: 29.5/km^{2} (76.4/sq mi)
- Time zone: UTC+1 (CET)
  - Summer (DST): UTC+2 (CEST)
- Postal code: 374 01
- Website: www.obechranice.cz

Hranice (German: Julienhain) is a municipality and village in České Budějovice District in the South Bohemian Region of the Czech Republic. It has about 200 inhabitants.

Hranice lies approximately 33 kilometres (21 mi) south-east of České Budějovice and 143 km (89 mi) south of Prague.

== Administrative division ==
Hranice consists of two municipal parts (in brackets population according to the 2021 census):

- Hranice (123)
- Trpnouze (64)

== Demographics ==
Historical population
Year	Pop.	±%
1869	874	—
1880	831	−4.9%
1890	791	−4.8%
1900	841	+6.3%
1910	773	−8.1%
1921	680	−12.0%
1930	572	−15.9%
1950	372	−35.0%
1961	386	+3.8%
1970	327	−15.3%
1980	275	−15.9%
1991	242	−12.0%
2001	243	+0.4%
2011	195	−19.8%
2021	187	−4.1%
Source: Censuses
