= Čížkrajice =

- Municipality
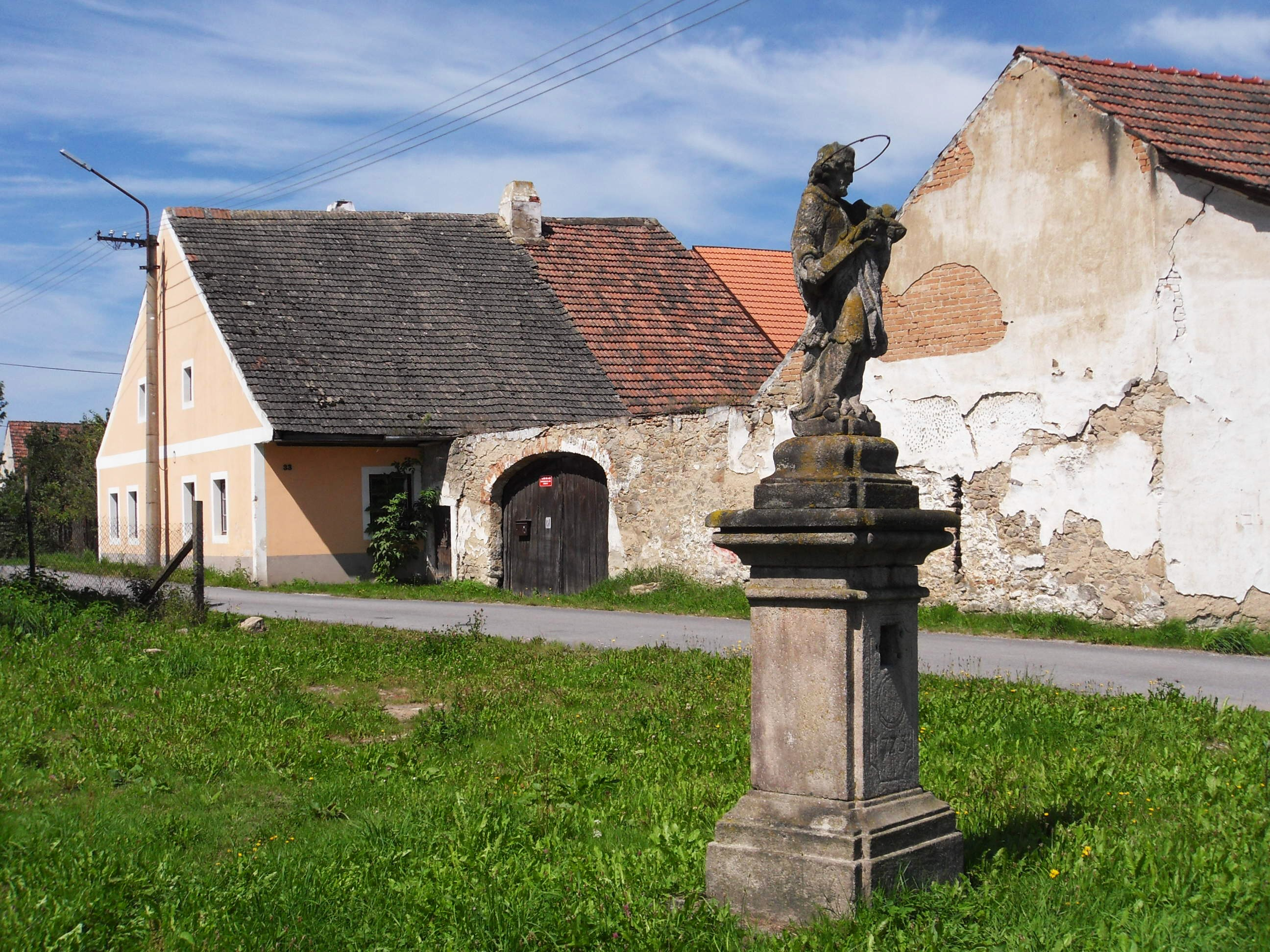
- Statue of Saint John of Nepomuk and former fort

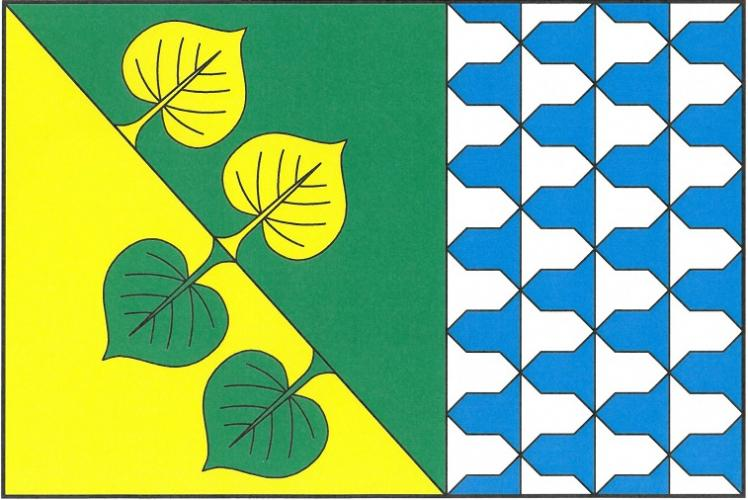
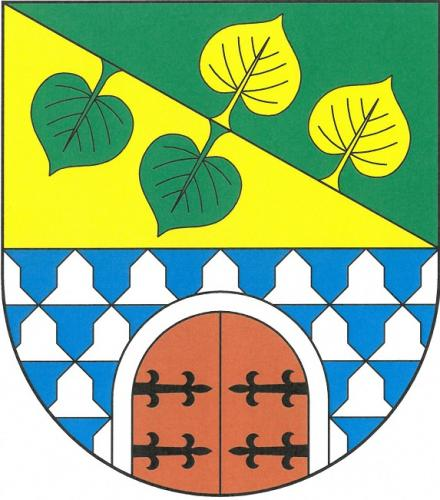
- Flag Coat of arms

- Location in the Czech Republic
- Coordinates: 48°48′24″N 14°38′10″E
- Country: Czech Republic
- Region: South Bohemian
- District: České Budějovice
- First mentioned: 1186

Area
  - Total: 9.00 km^{2} (3.47 sq mi)
- Elevation: 550 m (1,800 ft)

Population (2026-01-01)
  - Total: 296
  - Density: 32.9/km^{2} (85.2/sq mi)
- Time zone: UTC+1 (CET)
  - Summer (DST): UTC+2 (CEST)
- Postal code: 374 01
- Website: www.cizkrajice.cz

Čížkrajice is a municipality and village in České Budějovice District in the South Bohemian Region of the Czech Republic. It has about 300 inhabitants.

Čížkrajice lies approximately 23 kilometres (14 mi) south-east of České Budějovice and 144 km (89 mi) south of Prague.

== Administrative division ==
Čížkrajice consists of four municipal parts (in brackets population according to the 2021 census):

- Čížkrajice (116)
- Boršíkov (37)
- Chvalkov (80)
- Mezilesí (50)

== Demographics ==
Historical population
Year	Pop.	±%
1869	594	—
1880	638	+7.4%
1890	639	+0.2%
1900	621	−2.8%
1910	599	−3.5%
1921	568	−5.2%
1930	521	−8.3%
1950	327	−37.2%
1961	338	+3.4%
1970	280	−17.2%
1980	279	−0.4%
1991	270	−3.2%
2001	268	−0.7%
2011	261	−2.6%
2021	283	+8.4%
Source: Censuses
