= Čenkov u Bechyně =

- Municipality
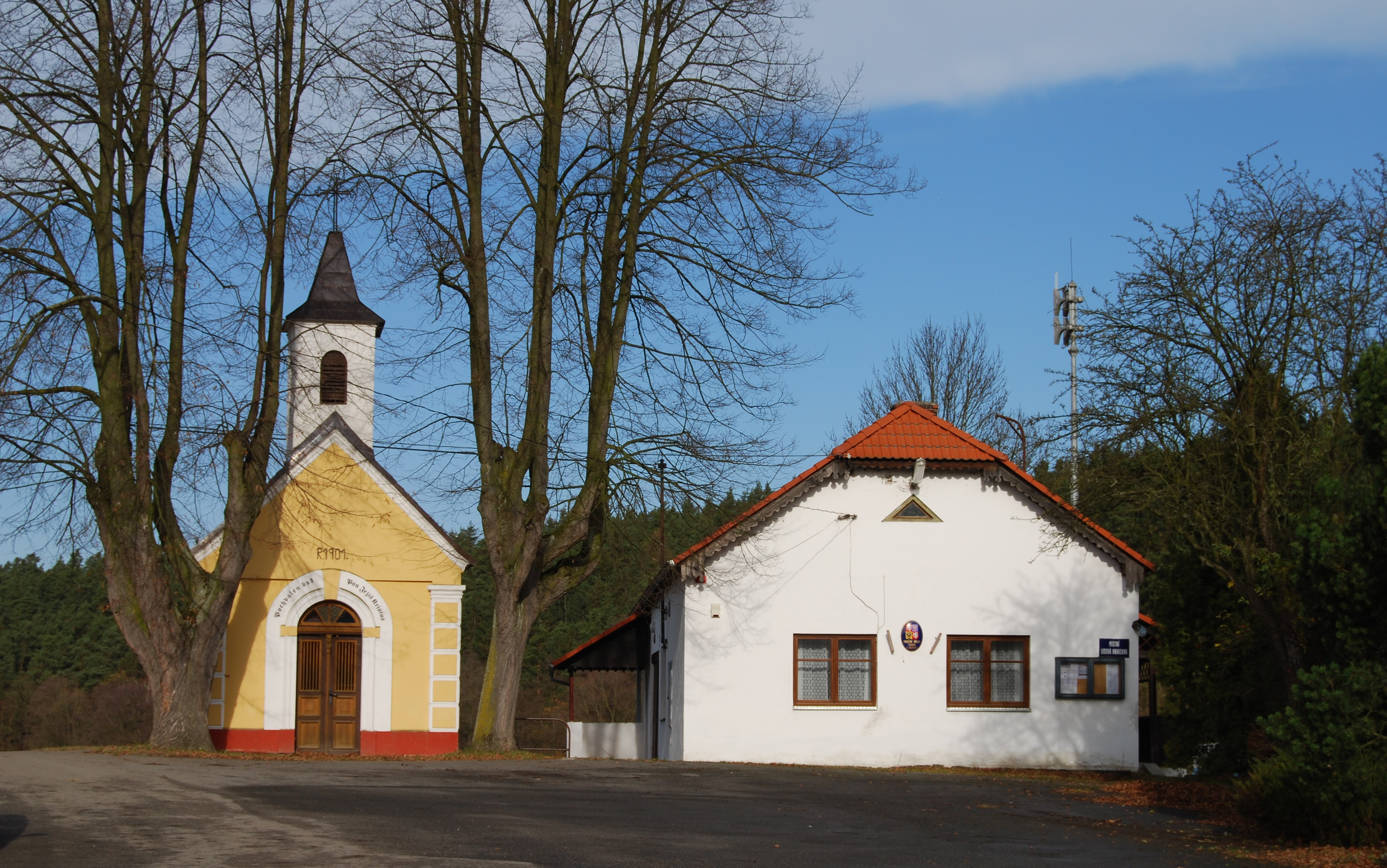
- Chapel and the municipal office

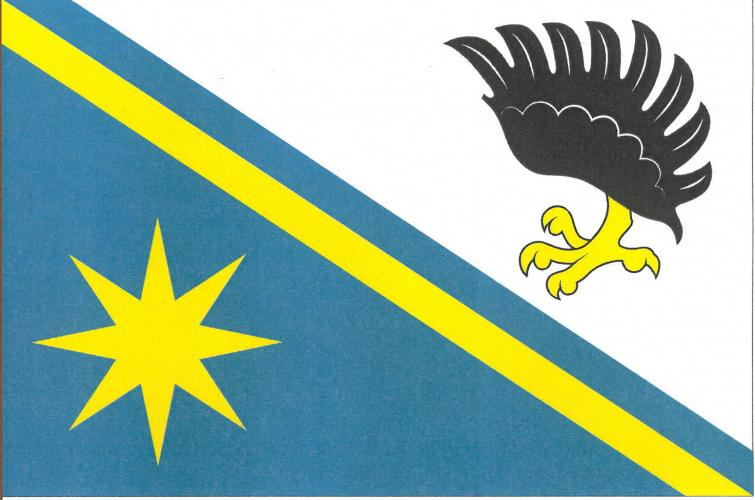
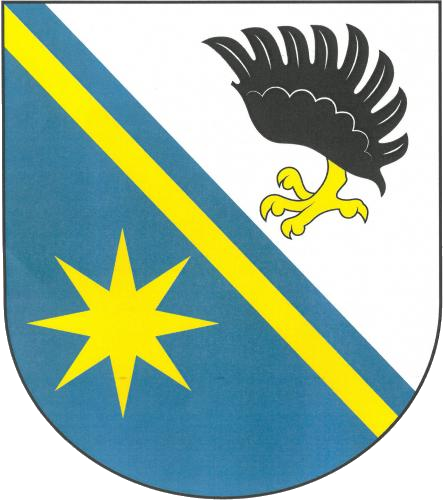
- Flag Coat of arms

- Location in the Czech Republic
- Coordinates: 49°14′0″N 14°30′3″E
- Country: Czech Republic
- Region: South Bohemian
- District: České Budějovice
- First mentioned: 1412

Area
  - Total: 1.35 km^{2} (0.52 sq mi)
- Elevation: 420 m (1,380 ft)

Population (2026-01-01)
  - Total: 62
  - Density: 46/km^{2} (120/sq mi)
- Time zone: UTC+1 (CET)
  - Summer (DST): UTC+2 (CEST)
- Postal code: 391 65
- Website: www.cenkov.cz

Čenkov u Bechyně is a municipality and village in České Budějovice District in the South Bohemian Region of the Czech Republic. It has about 60 inhabitants.

Čenkov u Bechyně lies approximately 29 kilometres (18 mi) north of České Budějovice and 95 km (59 mi) south of Prague.

== Demographics ==
Historical population
Year	Pop.	±%
1869	120	—
1880	115	−4.2%
1890	103	−10.4%
1900	102	−1.0%
1910	99	−2.9%
1921	112	+13.1%
1930	107	−4.5%
1950	74	−30.8%
1961	83	+12.2%
1970	65	−21.7%
1980	57	−12.3%
1991	52	−8.8%
2001	55	+5.8%
2011	46	−16.4%
2021	62	+34.8%
Source: Censuses
