= České Budějovice District =

České Budějovice District Okres České Budějovice
- District
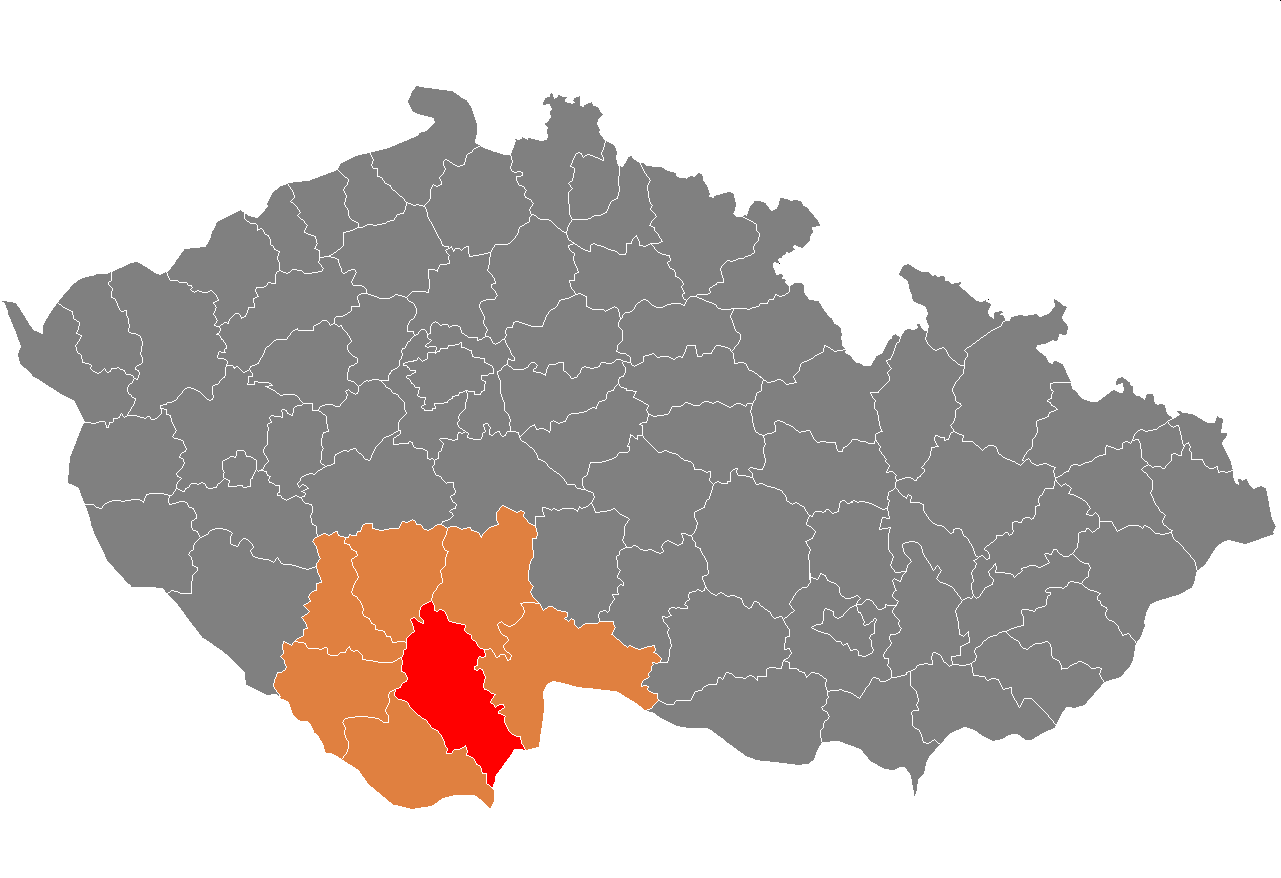
- Location in the South Bohemian Region within the Czech Republic
- Coordinates: 49°0′N 14°32′E
- Country: Czech Republic
- Region: South Bohemian
- Capital: České Budějovice

Area
  - Total: 1,638.49 km^{2} (632.62 sq mi)

Population (2026)
  - Total: 202,423
  - Density: 123.542/km^{2} (319.973/sq mi)
- Time zone: UTC+1 (CET)
  - Summer (DST): UTC+2 (CEST)
- Municipalities: 109
- * Cities and towns: 9
- * Market towns: 3

České Budějovice District (Czech: okres České Budějovice) is a district in the South Bohemian Region of the Czech Republic. Its capital is the city of České Budějovice.

== Administrative division ==
České Budějovice District is divided into three administrative districts of municipalities with extended competence: České Budějovice, Trhové Sviny and Týn nad Vltavou.

=== List of municipalities ===
Cities and towns are marked in bold and market towns in italics:

Adamov - Bečice - Borek - Borovany - Borovnice - Boršov nad Vltavou - Bošilec - Branišov - Břehov - Čakov - Čejkovice - Čenkov u Bechyně - České Budějovice - Chotýčany - Chrášťany - Čížkrajice - Dasný - Dívčice - Dobrá Voda u Českých Budějovic - Dobšice - Dolní Bukovsko - Doubravice - Doudleby - Drahotěšice - Dražíč - Dříteň - Dubičné - Dubné - Dynín - Habří - Hartmanice - Heřmaň - Hlavatce - Hlincová Hora - Hluboká nad Vltavou - Homole - Horní Kněžeklady - Horní Stropnice - Hosín - Hosty - Hradce - Hranice - Hrdějovice - Hůry - Hvozdec - Jankov - Jílovice - Jivno - Kamenná - Kamenný Újezd - Komařice - Kvítkovice - Ledenice - Libín - Libníč - Lipí - Lišov - Litvínovice - Ločenice - Mazelov - Mladošovice - Modrá Hůrka - Mokrý Lom - Mydlovary - Nákří - Nedabyle - Neplachov - Nová Ves - Nové Hrady - Olešnice - Olešník - Ostrolovský Újezd - Petříkov - Pištín - Planá - Plav - Radošovice - Římov - Roudné - Rudolfov - Sedlec - Ševětín - Slavče - Srubec - Staré Hodějovice - Štěpánovice - Strážkovice - Střížov - Strýčice - Svatý Jan nad Malší - Temelín - Trhové Sviny - Týn nad Vltavou - Úsilné - Včelná - Vidov - Vitín - Vlkov - Vrábče - Vráto - Všemyslice - Záboří - Žabovřesky - Zahájí - Žár - Závraty - Žimutice - Zliv - Zvíkov

== Geography ==
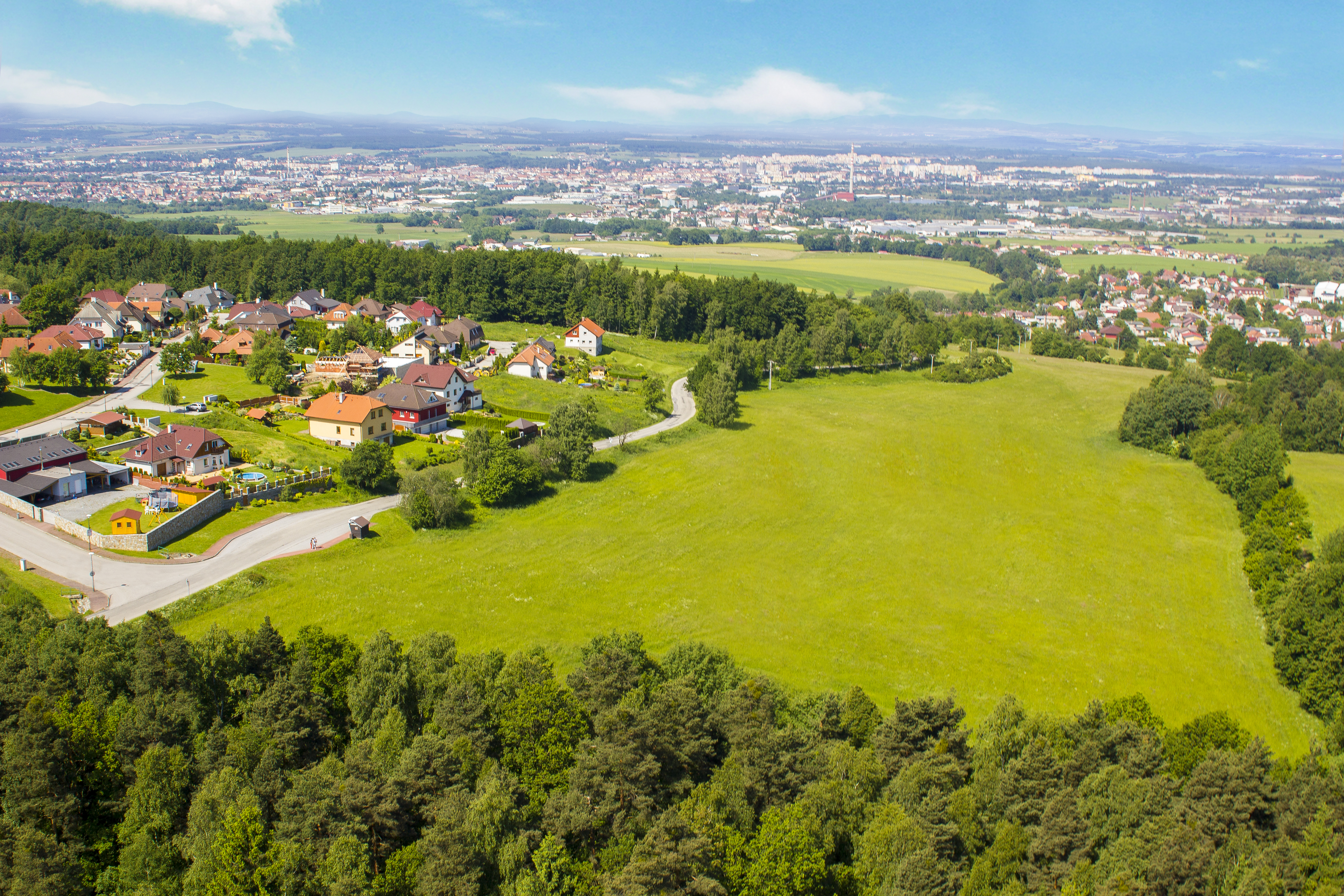
České Budějovice and surrounding landscape

České Budějovice District is the third largest Czech district with an area of 1,638 km^{2} (632 sq mi). It borders Austria in the southeast. The majority of the territory is hilly with a slightly undulating landscape, the central part of the district consists of a relatively flat landscape, which in the southeast passes into the foothills. The territory extends into five geomorphological mesoregions: Tábor Uplands (north), Třeboň Basin (east), České Budějovice Basin (east), Gratzen Mountains Foothills (south) and Gratzen Mountains (southeast). The highest point of the district is the mountain Vysoká in Horní Stropnice with an elevation of 1,034 m (3,392 ft), the lowest point is the river bed of the Vltava in Dražíč at 350 m (1,150 ft).

From the total district area of 1,638.5 km^{2} (632.6 sq mi), agricultural land occupies 862.6 km^{2} (333.1 sq mi), forests occupy 531.7 km^{2} (205.3 sq mi), and water area occupies 90.8 km^{2} (35.1 sq mi). Forests cover 32.4% of the district's area.

The most important river is the Vltava, which flows from southwest to north. Another significant rivers are the Malše (tributary of the Vltava) and Stropnice (tributary of the Malše). The area of the České Budějovice and Třeboň basins is known for its fishponds, which includes some of the large ponds in the country. An important body of water is also Římov Reservoir.

Small parts of the Třeboňsko Protected Landscape Area extends into the district in the east.

== Demographics ==
Historical population

Year	Pop.	±%
1869	116,772	—
1880	128,343	+9.9%
1890	133,452	+4.0%
1900	147,745	+10.7%
1910	160,505	+8.6%

Year	Pop.	±%
1921	161,538	+0.6%
1930	159,231	−1.4%
1950	134,792	−15.3%
1961	144,624	+7.3%
1970	151,558	+4.8%

Year	Pop.	±%
1980	165,003	+8.9%
1991	173,765	+5.3%
2001	178,506	+2.7%
2011	186,462	+4.5%
2021	196,897	+5.6%

Source: Censuses

=== Most populous municipalities ===
Name	Population	Area (km^{2})
České Budějovice	97,128	56
Týn nad Vltavou	7,728	43
Hluboká nad Vltavou	5,679	91
Trhové Sviny	5,292	53
Lišov	4,670	94
Borovany	4,168	42
Zliv	3,426	14
Srubec	2,971	6
Litvínovice	2,782	6
Kamenný Újezd	2,697	29

== Economy ==
České Budějovice is the economic centre of the entire South Bohemian Region. All the largest employees with headquarters in České Budějovice District and at least 500 employers have their seat in České Budějovice. The largest of these companies with at least 1,000 employees are:

Economic entity	Number of employees	Main activity
České Budějovice Hospital	4,000–4,999	Health care
dm-drogerie markt	3,000–3,999	Retail sale
Robert Bosch	3,000–3,999	Manufacture of parts for motor vehicles
University of South Bohemia in České Budějovice	2,500–2,999	Education
Regional Police Directorate of the South Bohemian Region	2,500–2,999	Public order and safety activities
Madeta	1,500–1,999	Dairy
Swietelsky stavební	1,500–1,999	Construction
ČEVAK	1,000–1,499	Operation of water management infrastructure
E.ON Česká republika	1,000–1,499	Distributor of electricity and natural gas
Jednota	1,000–1,499	Retail sale

The city of České Budějovice is also well-known for Budweiser Budvar Brewery.

A facility of national importance is the Temelín Nuclear Power Station, one of two nuclear power stations in the country.

== Transport ==
The D3 motorway (part of European route E55) leads from Prague to České Budějovice and further continues as the I/3 road to the Czech–Austrian border.

== Sights ==
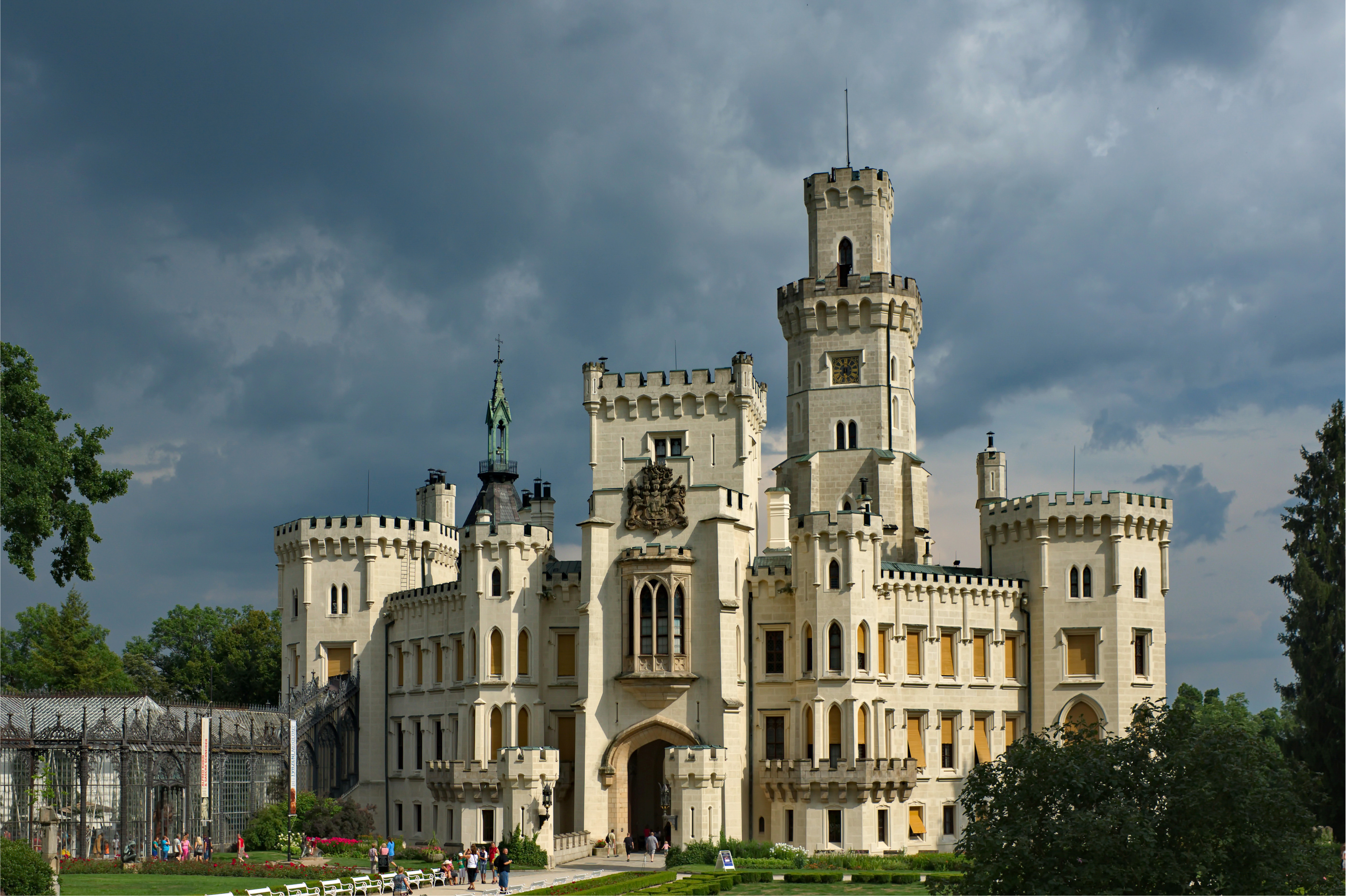
Hluboká Castle

The village of Holašovice was designated a UNESCO World Heritage Site in 1998 because of its exceptional preservation of a traditional Baroque-era village.

The most important monuments in the district, protected as national cultural monuments, are:

- Preserved sections of the Budweis–Linz Horse-Drawn Railway
- Birthplace of Jan Žižka in Trocnov
- Hluboká Castle and the Ohrada Castle
- Nové Hrady Castle
- Fishponds of the Třeboň Basin (partially)
- Pilgrimage complex with the Church of the Holy Spirit and Loreto Chapel of Santa Casa in Římov
- Set of Passion chapels in Římov

The best-preserved settlements and landscapes, protected as monument reservations and monument zones, are:

- České Budějovice (monument reservation)
- Holašovice (monument reservation)
- Malé Chrášťany (monument reservation)
- Mazelov (monument reservation)
- Plástovice (monument reservation)
- Záboří (monument reservation)
- Nové Hrady
- Trhové Sviny
- Týn nad Vltavou
- Bavorovice
- Bošilec
- Božejov
- Břehov
- Dobčice
- Dynín
- Kojákovice
- Lipanovice
- Munice
- Opatovice
- Rožnov
- Vitín
- Zbudov
- Novohradsko landscape
- Římovsko landscape

The most visited tourist destinations are the Ohrada Zoo in Hluboká nad Vltavou, Hluboká Castle, and Dvorec Zoo in Borovany.
