= Dasný =

- Municipality
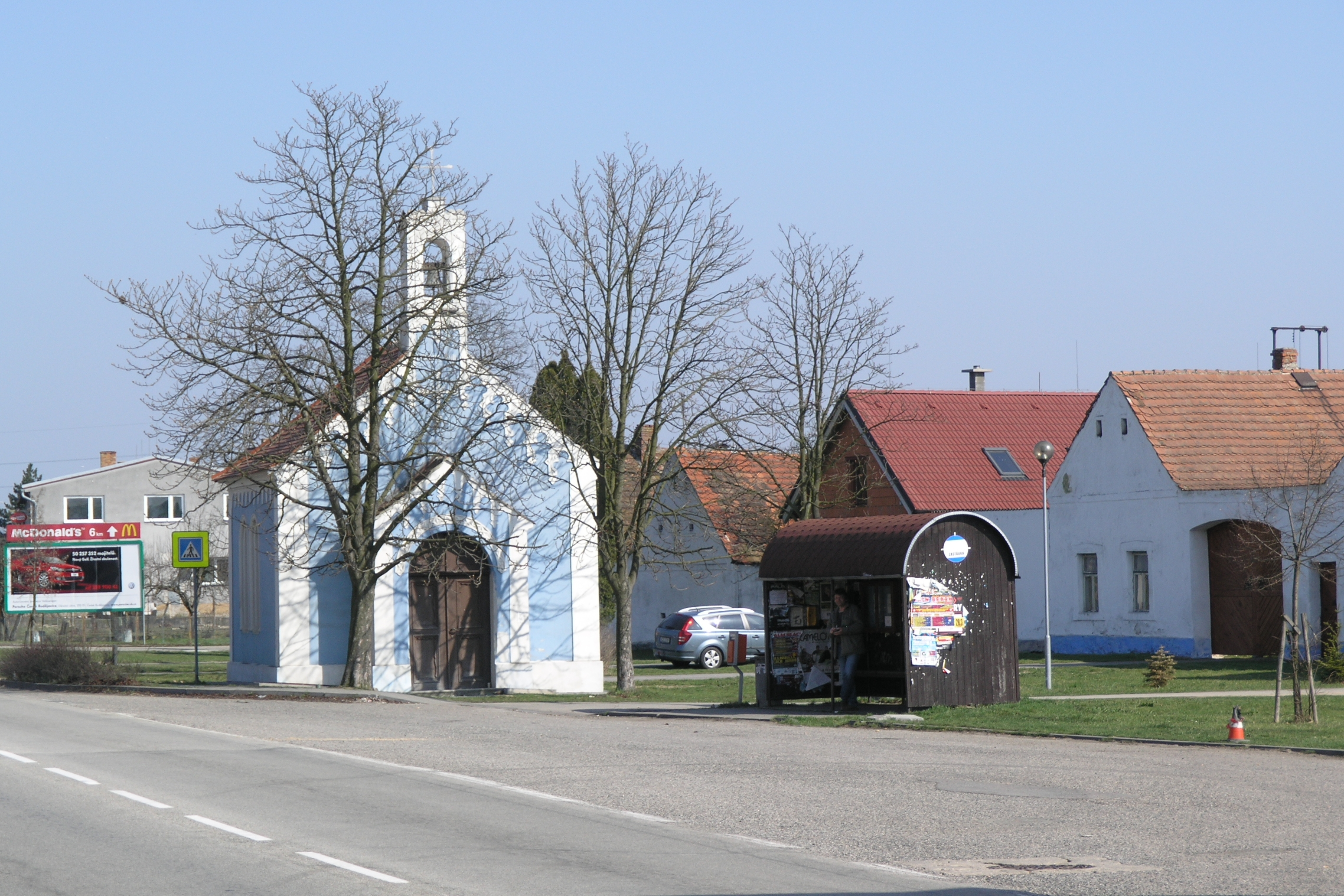
- Chapel of Saint John of Nepomuk

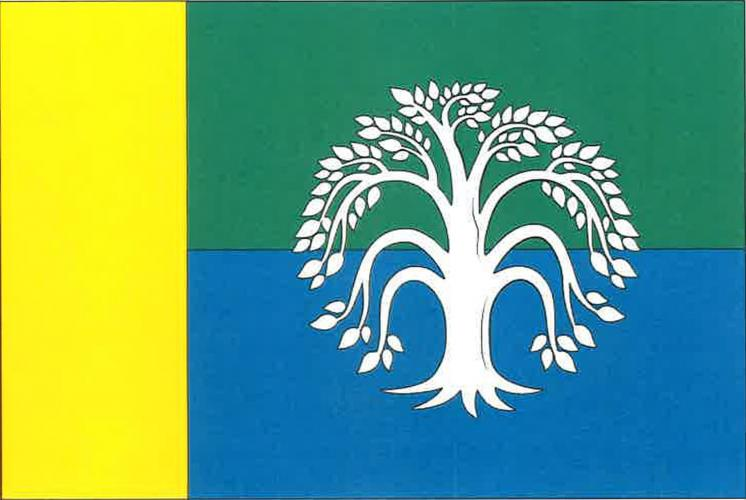
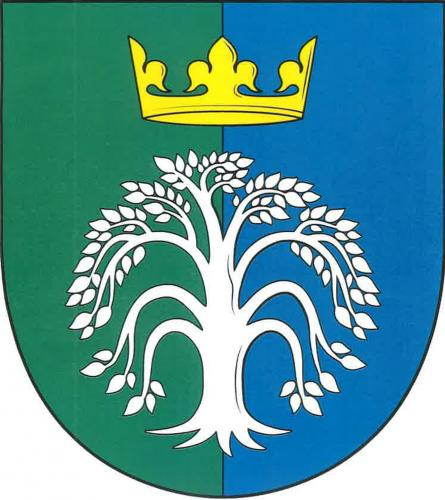
- Flag Coat of arms

- Location in the Czech Republic
- Coordinates: 49°1′10″N 14°24′27″E
- Country: Czech Republic
- Region: South Bohemian
- District: České Budějovice
- First mentioned: 1418

Area
  - Total: 3.40 km^{2} (1.31 sq mi)
- Elevation: 385 m (1,263 ft)

Population (2026-01-01)
  - Total: 357
  - Density: 105/km^{2} (272/sq mi)
- Time zone: UTC+1 (CET)
  - Summer (DST): UTC+2 (CEST)
- Postal code: 373 41
- Website: www.dasny.cz

Dasný (German: Kronfellern) is a municipality and village in České Budějovice District in the South Bohemian Region of the Czech Republic. It has about 400 inhabitants.

Dasný lies approximately 7 kilometres (4 mi) north-west of České Budějovice and 119 km (74 mi) south of Prague.

== Demographics ==
Historical population
Year	Pop.	±%
1869	253	—
1880	264	+4.3%
1890	250	−5.3%
1900	245	−2.0%
1910	259	+5.7%
1921	242	−6.6%
1930	252	+4.1%
1950	187	−25.8%
1961	204	+9.1%
1970	167	−18.1%
1980	181	+8.4%
1991	200	+10.5%
2001	230	+15.0%
2011	318	+38.3%
2021	338	+6.3%
Source: Censuses
