= Břehov =

- Municipality
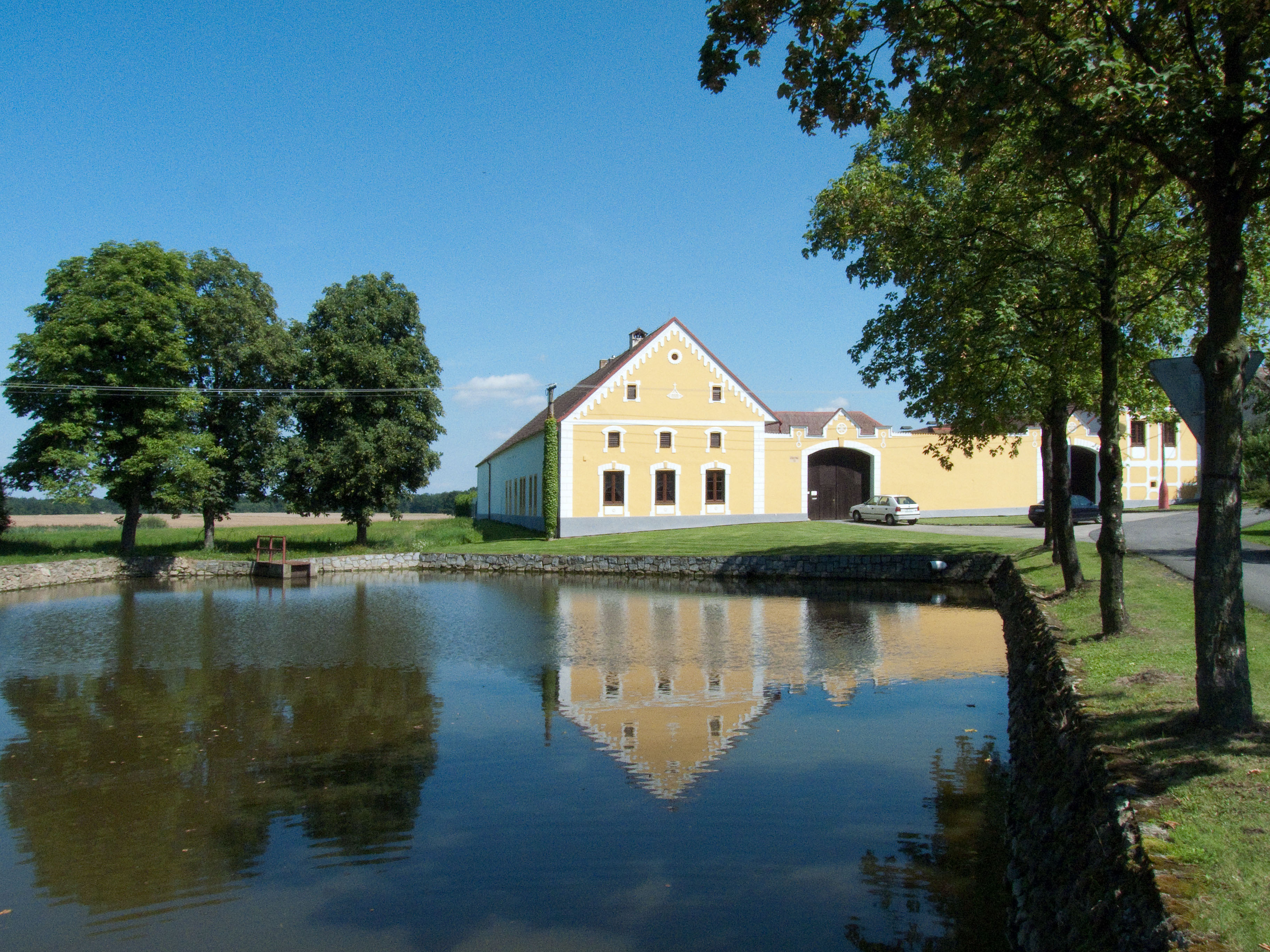
- Pond in the centre of Břehov

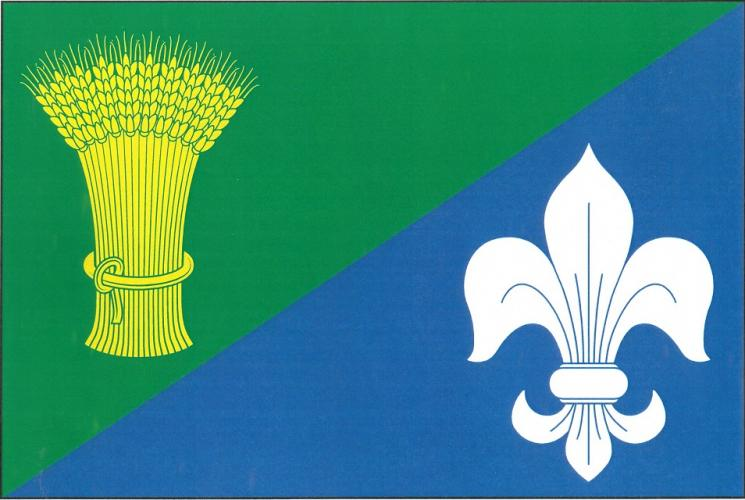
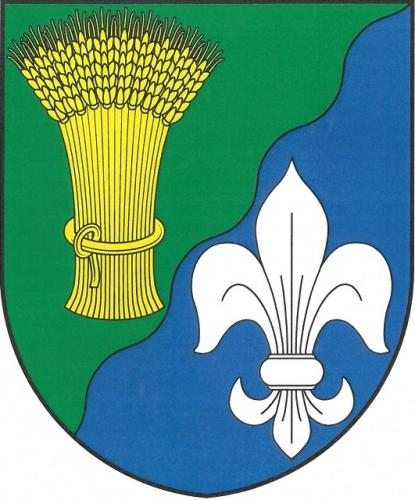
- Flag Coat of arms

- Location in the Czech Republic
- Coordinates: 49°1′21″N 14°19′50″E
- Country: Czech Republic
- Region: South Bohemian
- District: České Budějovice
- First mentioned: 1378

Area
  - Total: 10.12 km^{2} (3.91 sq mi)
- Elevation: 403 m (1,322 ft)

Population (2026-01-01)
  - Total: 178
  - Density: 17.6/km^{2} (45.6/sq mi)
- Time zone: UTC+1 (CET)
  - Summer (DST): UTC+2 (CEST)
- Postal code: 373 41
- Website: www.brehov.cz

Břehov (German: Schwiehalm) is a municipality and village in České Budějovice District in the South Bohemian Region of the Czech Republic. It has about 200 inhabitants. The village is well preserved and is protected as a village monument zone.

Břehov lies approximately 12 kilometres (7 mi) north-west of České Budějovice and 119 km (74 mi) south of Prague.

== Demographics ==
Historical population
Year	Pop.	±%
1869	211	—
1880	265	+25.6%
1890	255	−3.8%
1900	267	+4.7%
1910	230	−13.9%
1921	234	+1.7%
1930	240	+2.6%
1950	150	−37.5%
1961	151	+0.7%
1970	124	−17.9%
1980	118	−4.8%
1991	106	−10.2%
2001	108	+1.9%
2011	143	+32.4%
2021	172	+20.3%
Source: Censuses
