= Hartmanice (České Budějovice District) =

- Municipality
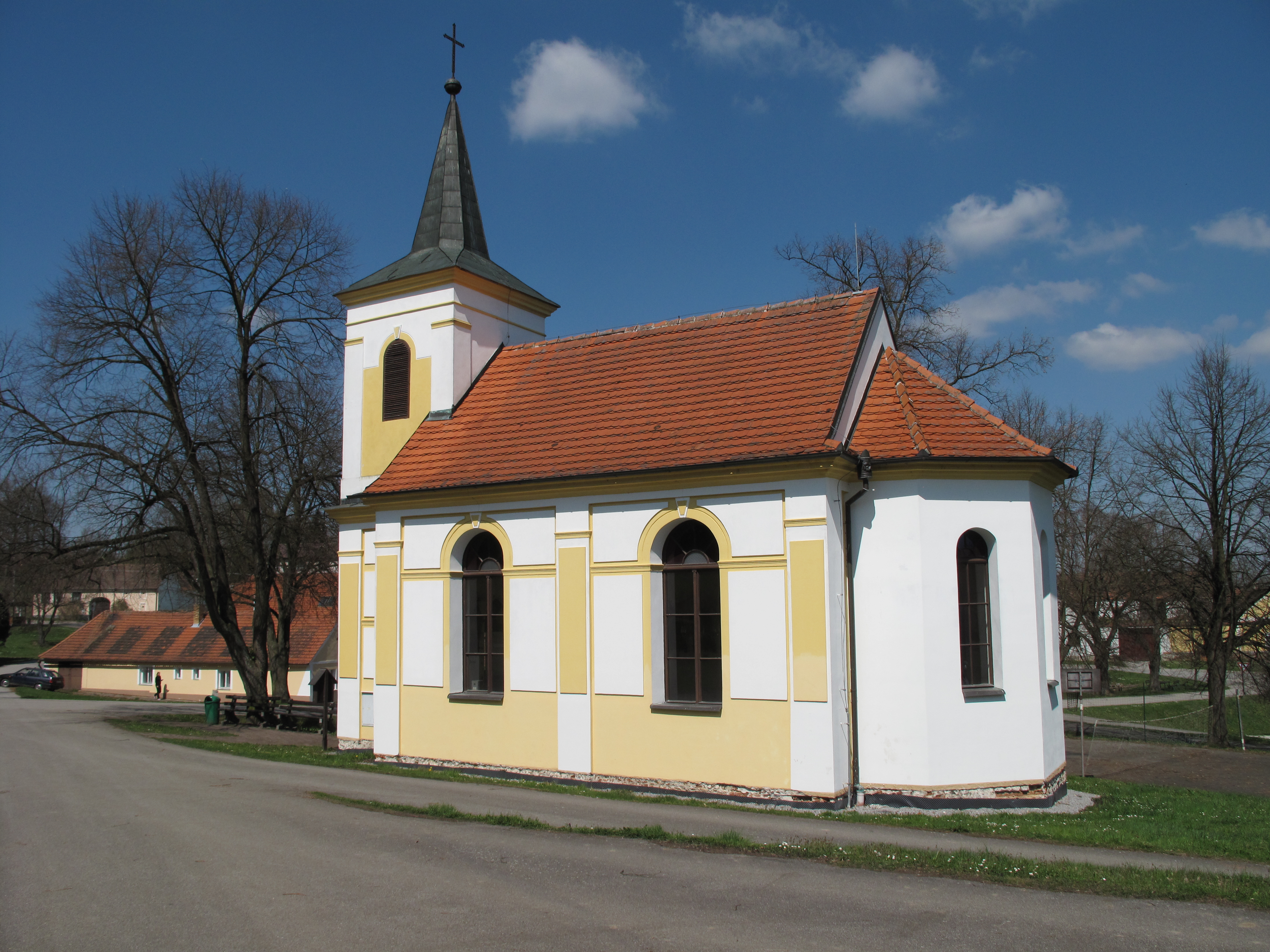
- Chapel

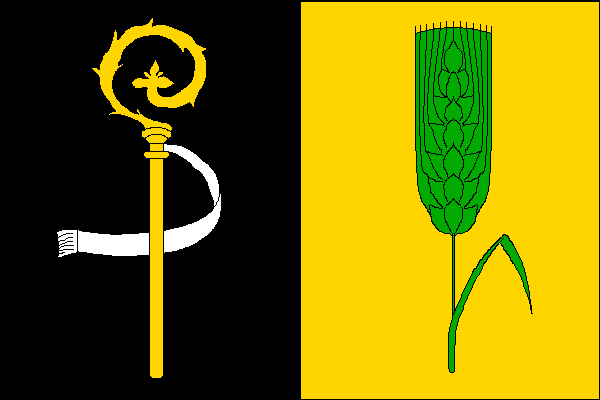
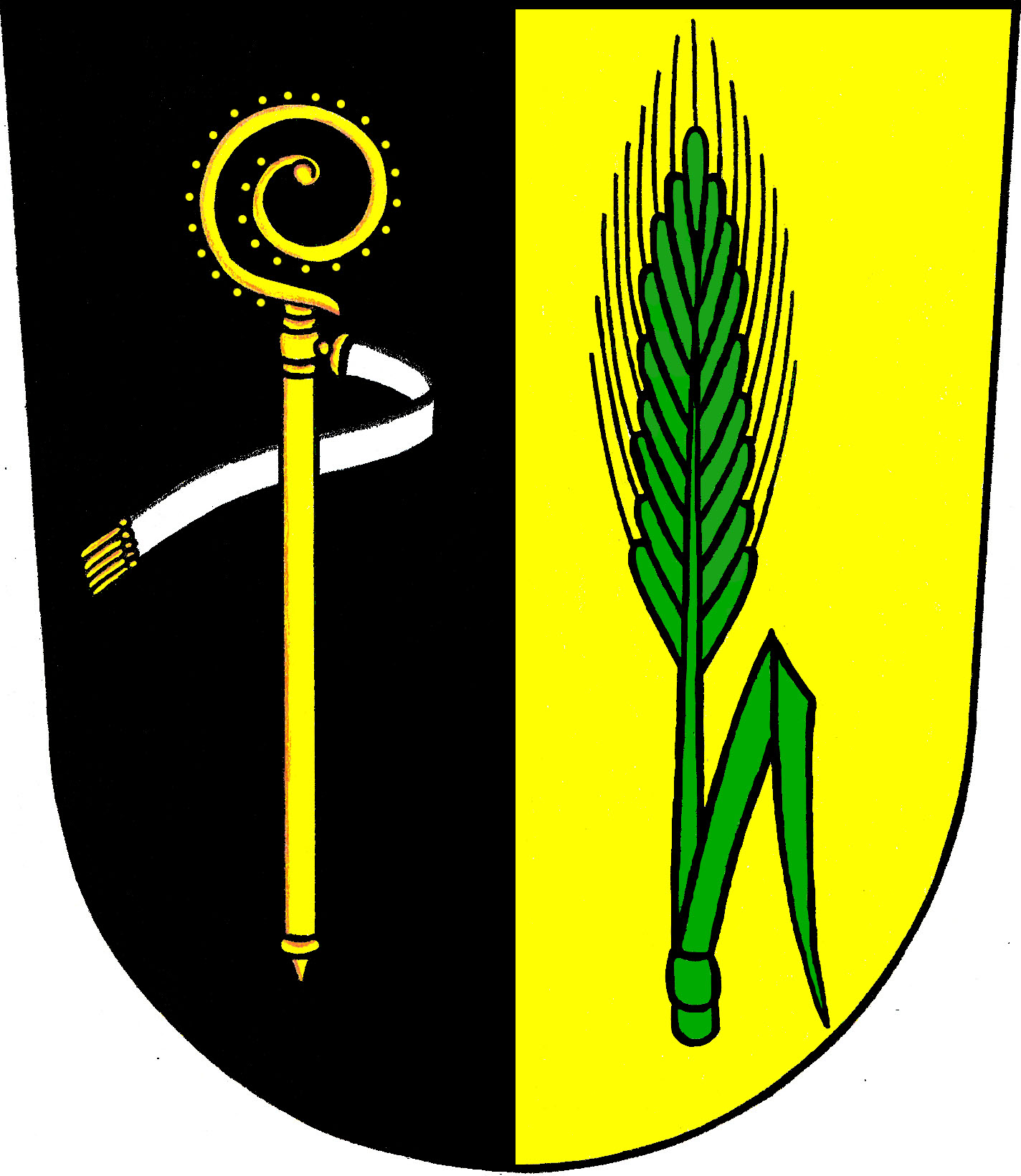
- Flag Coat of arms

- Location in the Czech Republic
- Coordinates: 49°12′29″N 14°33′54″E
- Country: Czech Republic
- Region: South Bohemian
- District: České Budějovice
- First mentioned: 1219

Area
  - Total: 8.98 km^{2} (3.47 sq mi)
- Elevation: 474 m (1,555 ft)

Population (2026-01-01)
  - Total: 194
  - Density: 21.6/km^{2} (56.0/sq mi)
- Time zone: UTC+1 (CET)
  - Summer (DST): UTC+2 (CEST)
- Postal code: 373 65
- Website: www.obechartmanice.cz

Hartmanice is a municipality and village in České Budějovice District in the South Bohemian Region of the Czech Republic. It has about 200 inhabitants.

Hartmanice lies approximately 27 kilometres (17 mi) north of České Budějovice and 99 km (62 mi) south of Prague.

== Demographics ==
Historical population
Year	Pop.	±%
1869	298	—
1880	326	+9.4%
1890	281	−13.8%
1900	264	−6.0%
1910	284	+7.6%
1921	289	+1.8%
1930	277	−4.2%
1950	202	−27.1%
1961	217	+7.4%
1970	184	−15.2%
1980	186	+1.1%
1991	167	−10.2%
2001	185	+10.8%
2011	173	−6.5%
2021	178	+2.9%
Source: Censuses
