= České Budějovice agglomeration =

Area of the Czech Republic

České Budějovice agglomeration Českobudějovická aglomerace
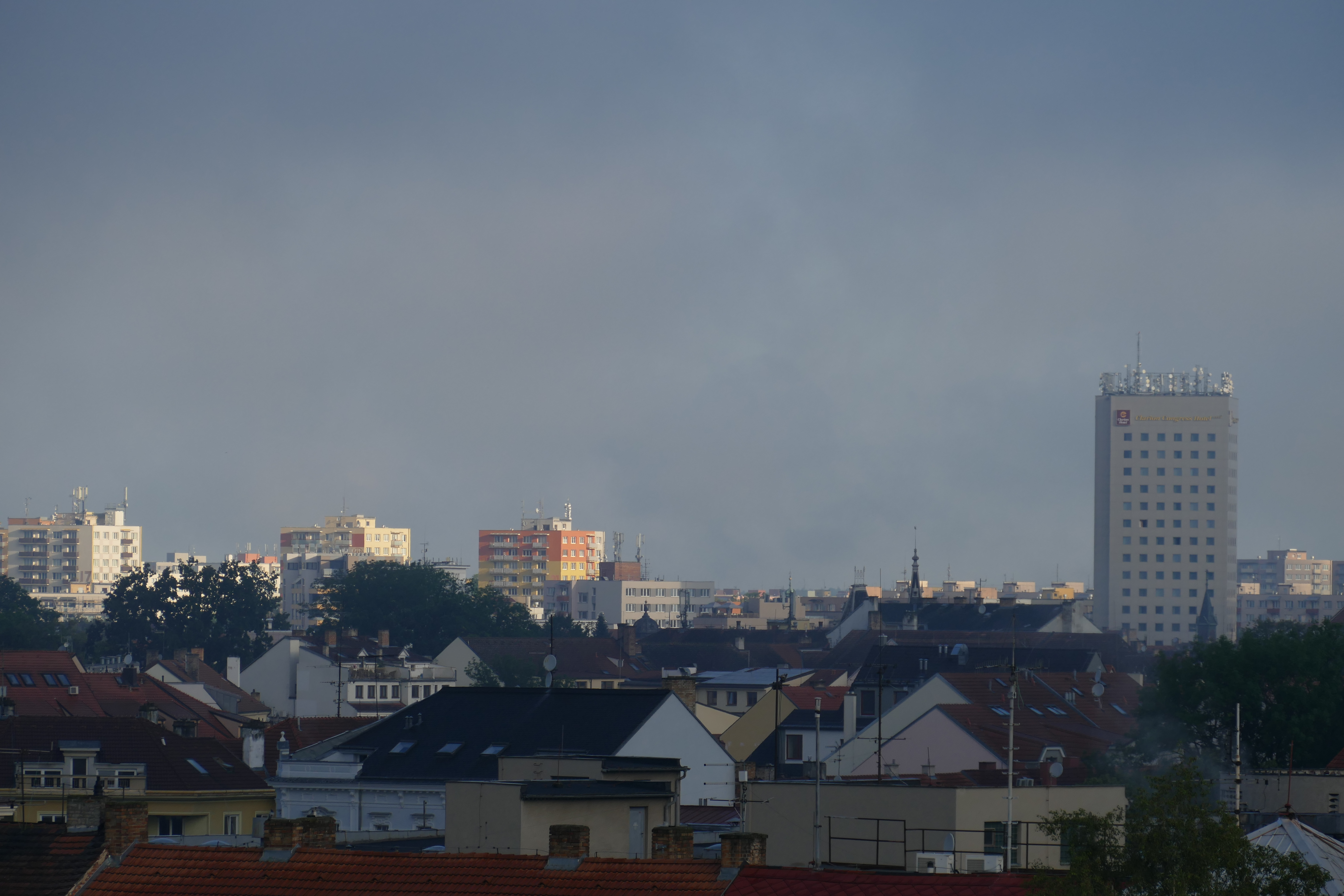
- Skyline of České Budějovice
- Country: Czech Republic
- Region: South Bohemian
- Largest city: České Budějovice

Area
  - Total: 1,000.7 km^{2} (386.4 sq mi)

Population (2024)
  - Total: 179,741
  - Density: 179.62/km^{2} (465.20/sq mi)
- Time zone: UTC+1 (CET)
  - Summer (DST): UTC+2 (CEST)

The České Budějovice agglomeration (Czech: Českobudějovická aglomerace) is the agglomeration of the city of České Budějovice and its surroundings in the Czech Republic. It was defined in 2020 as a tool for drawing money from the European Structural and Investment Funds and is valid in 2021–2027. The agglomeration has a population of about 180,000.

== Definition ==
The České Budějovice agglomeration was defined in 2020 by the Ministry of Regional Development of the Czech Republic for the purposes of the so-called Integrated Territorial Investment (ITI), which is a tool for drawing money from the European Structural and Investment Funds.

The territory was defined on the basis of a coefficient composed of three methods: integrated system of centres (i.e. delineation of commuting flows based on mobile operator data from 2019), time spent in core cities (based on mobile operator data from 2019) and residential suburbanization zones (based on statistics of realized housing construction and directional migration from the core of the agglomeration to suburban municipalities in the period 2009–2016). The scope of the territory is valid for the period 2021–2027.

== Municipalities ==
The agglomeration includes 81 municipalities.

Name	Population (2024)
Adamov	1,037
Babice	161
Borek	1,586
Borovany	4,178
Borovnice	154
Boršov nad Vltavou	2,065
Branišov	279
Břehov	171
Čakov	302
Čejkovice	401
České Budějovice	97,377
Chlumec	108
Chotýčany	258
Dasný	345
Dobrá Voda u Českých Budějovic	2,669
Dolní Třebonín	1,350
Doubravice	331
Doudleby	473
Drahotěšice	330
Dubičné	407
Dubné	1,733
Habří	122
Heřmaň	203
Hlincová Hora	489
Hluboká nad Vltavou	5,597
Holubov	1,097
Homole	1,676
Hosín	972
Hradce	112
Hrdějovice	1,491
Hůry	610
Hvozdec	139
Jivno	424
Kamenný Újezd	2,682
Komařice	371
Křemže	3,009
Kvítkovice	133
Ledenice	2,547
Libín	433
Libníč	565
Lipí	679
Lišov	4,687
Litvínovice	2,761
Mahouš	163
Mazelov	245
Mladošovice	427
Mokrý Lom	113
Nedabyle	366
Němčice	180
Nová Ves	778
Olešník	806
Ostrolovský Újezd	181
Pištín	662
Planá	263
Plav	438
Radošovice	198
Římov	1,020
Roudné	1,470
Rudolfov	2,559
Sedlec	527
Ševětín	1,377
Smržov	113
Srubec	2,977
Staré Hodějovice	1,308
Štěpánovice	983
Strážkovice	525
Střížov	223
Strýčice	56
Trhové Sviny	5,284
Úsilné	496
Včelná	2,270
Vidov	599
Vitín	489
Vlkov	49
Vrábče	861
Vráto	513
Žabovřesky	439
Zahájí	452
Závraty	62
Zliv	3,499
Zvíkov	256
Total	179,741
