= Borovnice =

Borovnice may refer to places in the Czech Republic:

- Borovnice (Benešov District), a municipality and village in the Central Bohemian Region
- Borovnice (České Budějovice District), a municipality and village in the South Bohemian Region
- Borovnice (Rychnov nad Kněžnou District), a municipality and village in the Hradec Králové Region
- Borovnice (Trutnov District), a municipality and village in the Hradec Králové Region
- Borovnice (Žďár nad Sázavou District), a municipality and village in the Vysočina Region
