= Štěpánovice (České Budějovice District) =

- Municipality
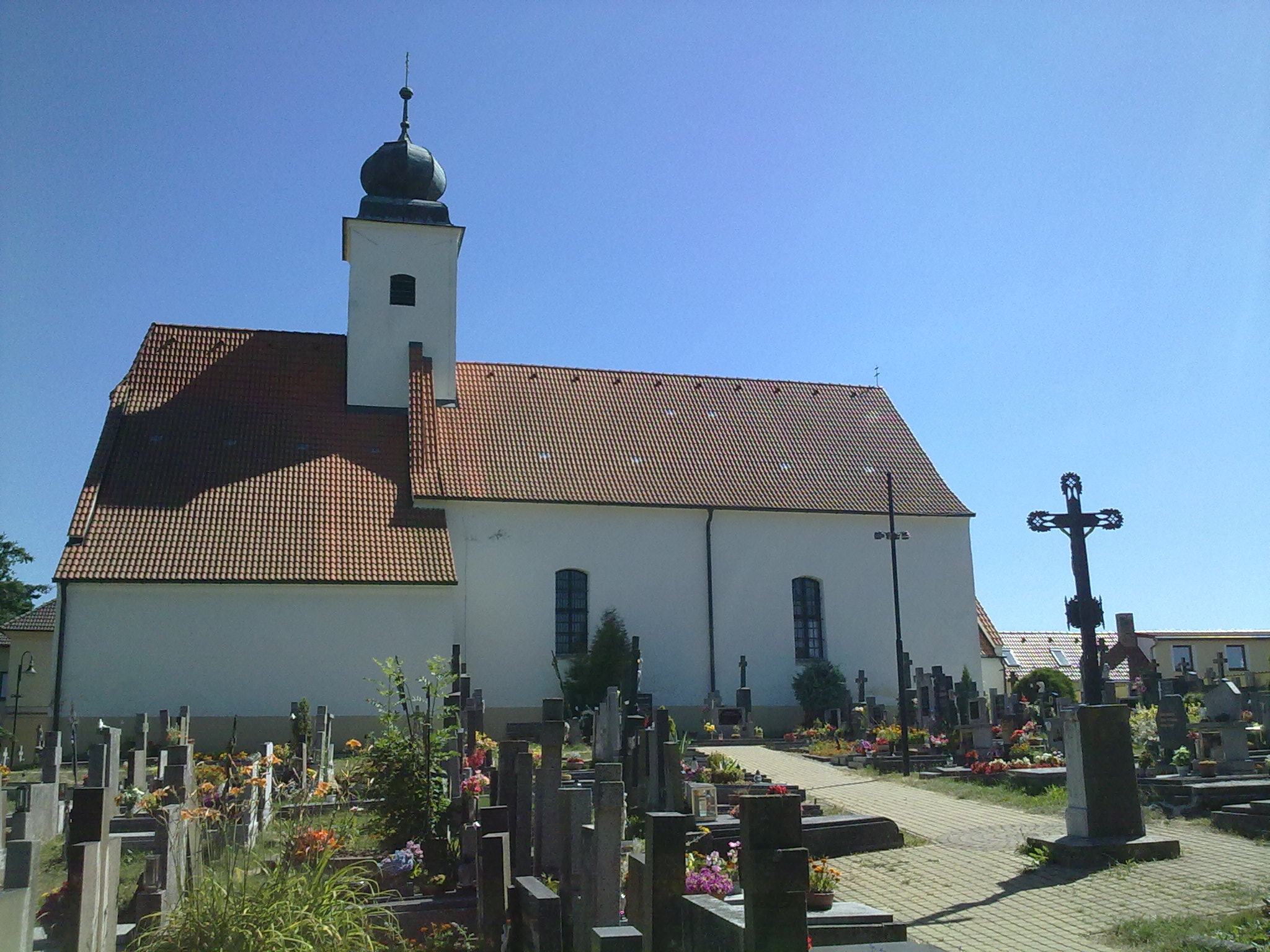
- Church of the Assumption of the Virgin Mary

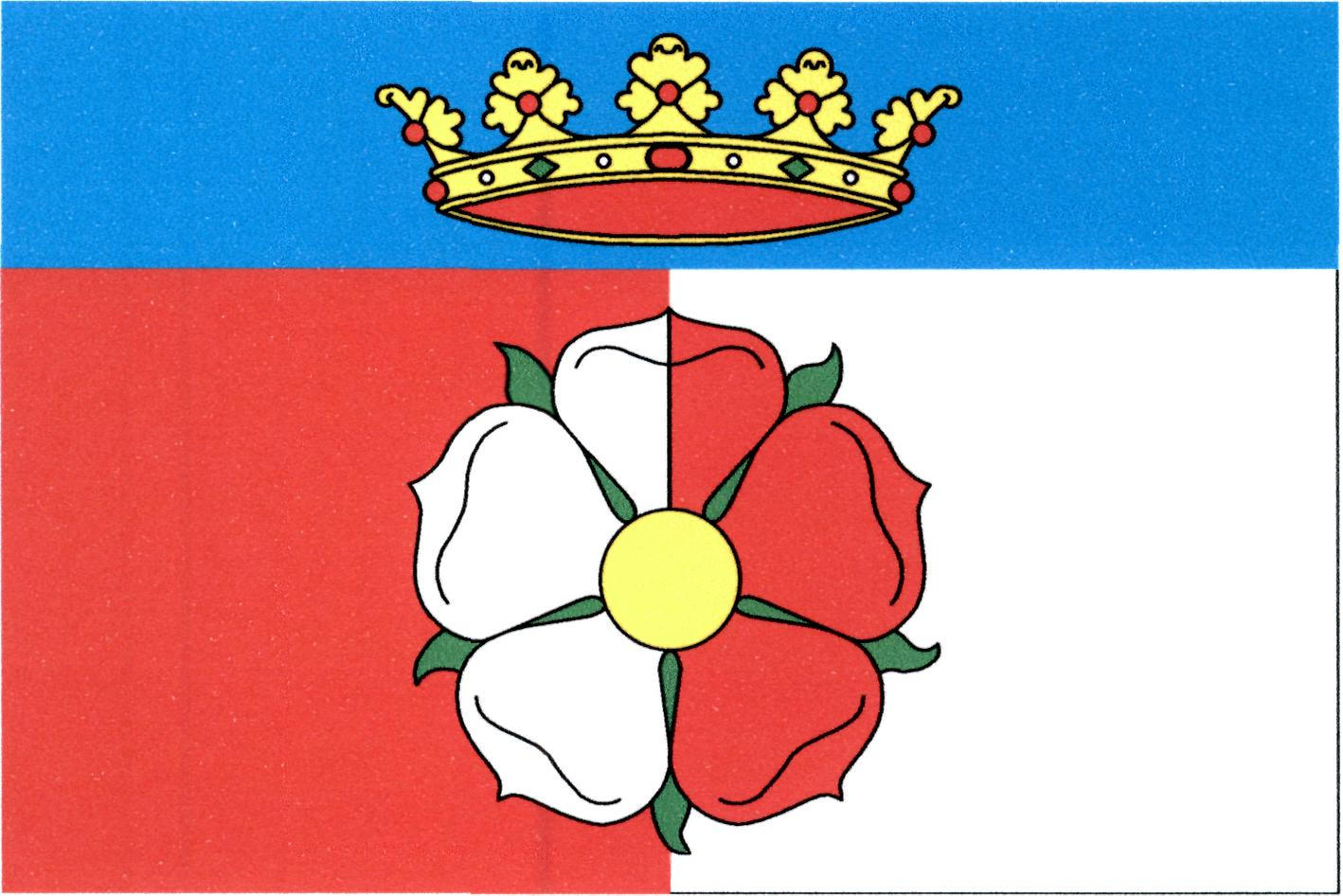
- Flag Coat of arms

- Location in the Czech Republic
- Coordinates: 49°0′7″N 14°39′12″E
- Country: Czech Republic
- Region: South Bohemian
- District: České Budějovice
- First mentioned: 1363

Area
  - Total: 14.61 km^{2} (5.64 sq mi)
- Elevation: 463 m (1,519 ft)

Population (2026-01-01)
  - Total: 1,019
  - Density: 69.75/km^{2} (180.6/sq mi)
- Time zone: UTC+1 (CET)
  - Summer (DST): UTC+2 (CEST)
- Postal code: 373 73
- Website: www.stepanovice.eu

Štěpánovice is a municipality and village in České Budějovice District in the South Bohemian Region of the Czech Republic. It has about 1,000 inhabitants.

Štěpánovice lies approximately 14 kilometres (9 mi) east of České Budějovice and 122 km (76 mi) south of Prague.

== Demographics ==
Historical population
Year	Pop.	±%
1869	673	—
1880	683	+1.5%
1890	619	−9.4%
1900	624	+0.8%
1910	696	+11.5%
1921	705	+1.3%
1930	688	−2.4%
1950	586	−14.8%
1961	642	+9.6%
1970	631	−1.7%
1980	641	+1.6%
1991	588	−8.3%
2001	637	+8.3%
2011	790	+24.0%
2021	956	+21.0%
Source: Censuses
