= Branišov =

- Municipality
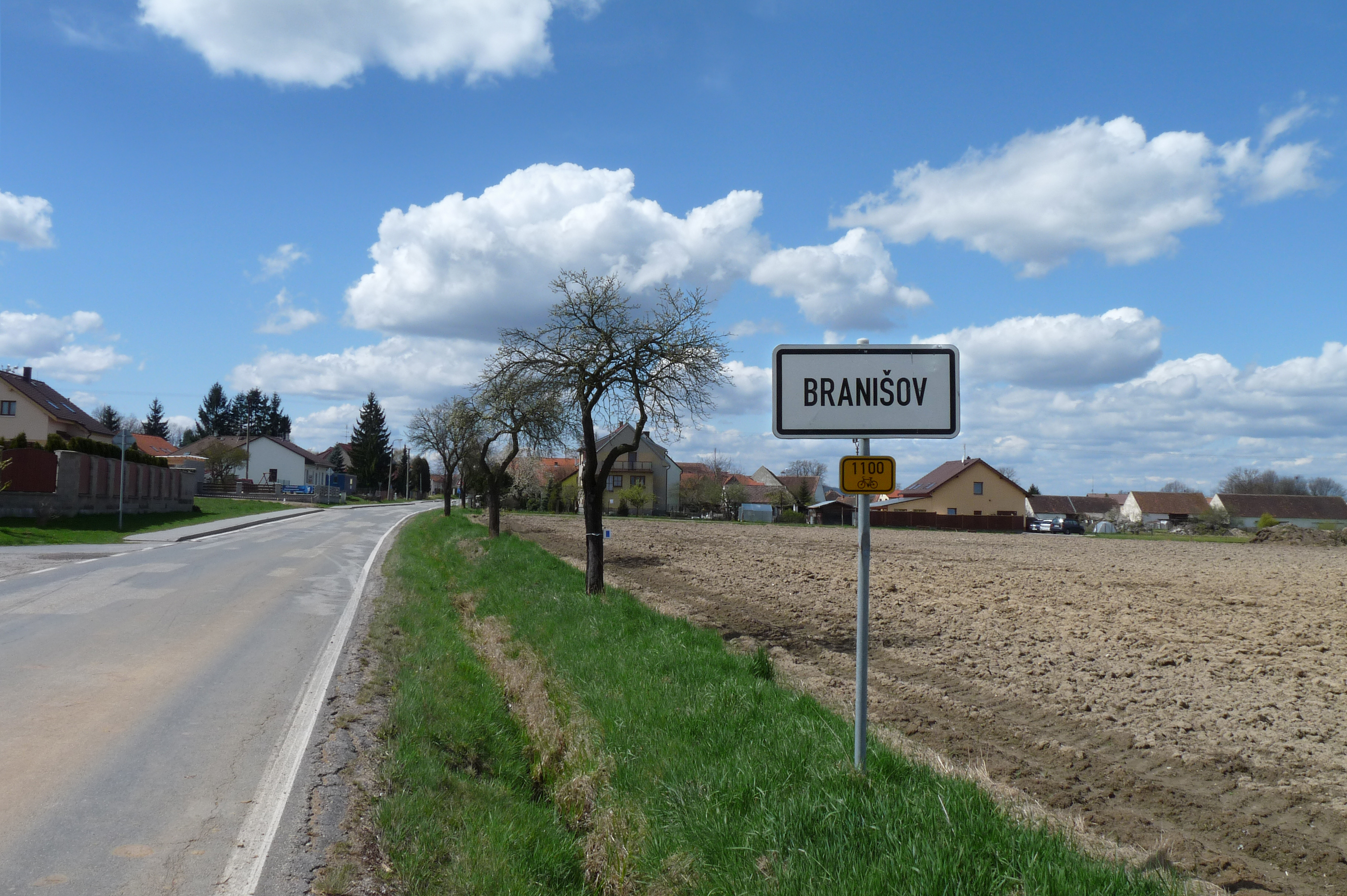
- Entrance to Branišov

- Location in the Czech Republic
- Coordinates: 48°58′44″N 14°23′45″E
- Country: Czech Republic
- Region: South Bohemian
- District: České Budějovice
- First mentioned: 1391

Area
  - Total: 5.18 km^{2} (2.00 sq mi)
- Elevation: 409 m (1,342 ft)

Population (2026-01-01)
  - Total: 278
  - Density: 53.7/km^{2} (139/sq mi)
- Time zone: UTC+1 (CET)
  - Summer (DST): UTC+2 (CEST)
- Postal code: 373 84
- Website: branisov.cz

Branišov is a municipality and village in České Budějovice District in the South Bohemian Region of the Czech Republic. It has about 300 inhabitants.

Branišov lies approximately 6 kilometres (4 mi) west of České Budějovice and 124 km (77 mi) south of Prague.

== History ==
The first written mention of Branišov is from 1391.

== Demographics ==
Historical population
Year	Pop.	±%
1869	278	—
1880	242	−12.9%
1890	262	+8.3%
1900	237	−9.5%
1910	226	−4.6%
1921	205	−9.3%
1930	207	+1.0%
1950	175	−15.5%
1961	190	+8.6%
1970	164	−13.7%
1980	154	−6.1%
1991	152	−1.3%
2001	158	+3.9%
2011	247	+56.3%
2021	271	+9.7%
Source: Censuses
