= Hradce =

- Municipality
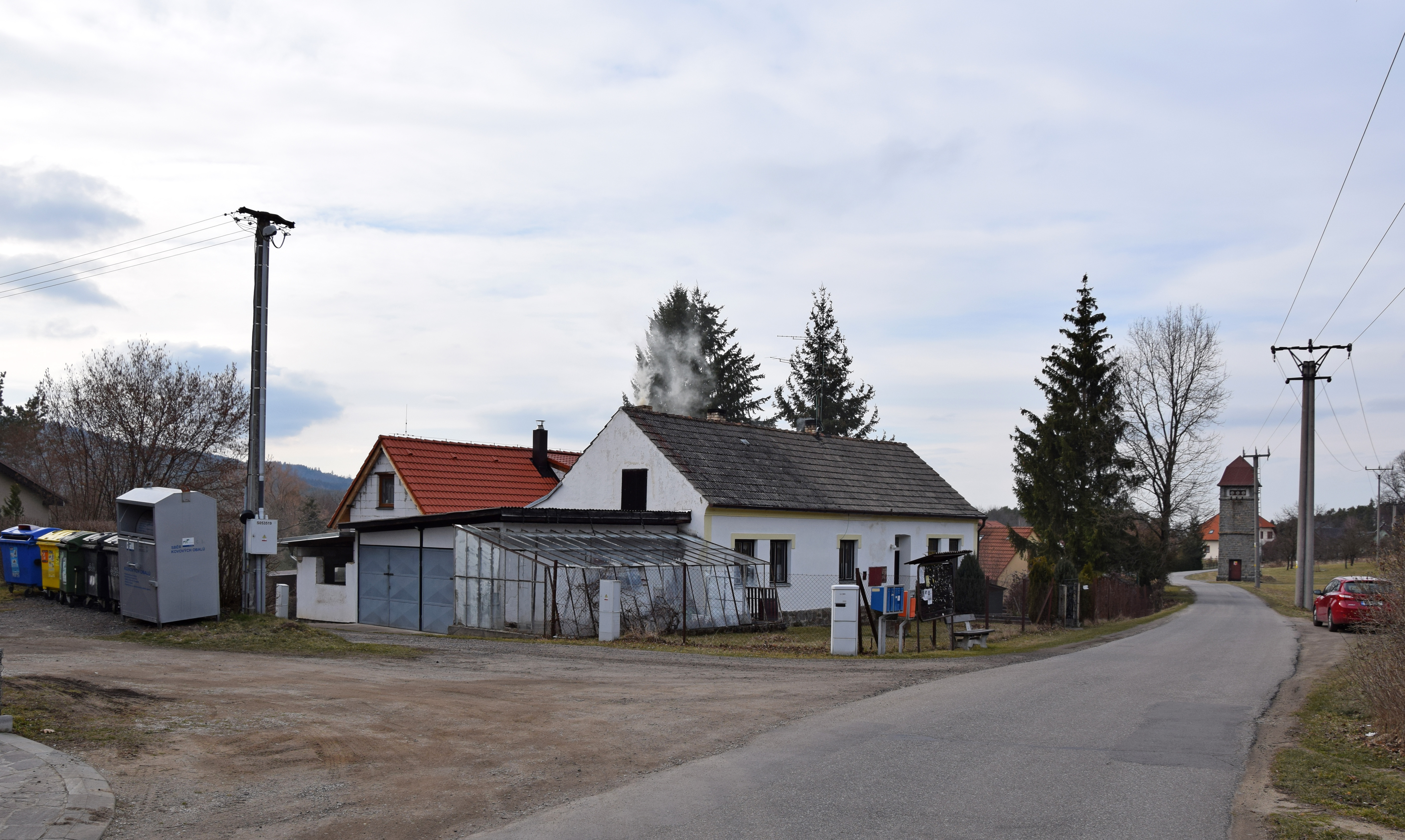
- Main street

- Location in the Czech Republic
- Coordinates: 48°56′2″N 14°21′35″E
- Country: Czech Republic
- Region: South Bohemian
- District: České Budějovice
- First mentioned: 1375

Area
  - Total: 1.19 km^{2} (0.46 sq mi)
- Elevation: 494 m (1,621 ft)

Population (2026-01-01)
  - Total: 116
  - Density: 97.5/km^{2} (252/sq mi)
- Time zone: UTC+1 (CET)
  - Summer (DST): UTC+2 (CEST)
- Postal code: 370 01
- Website: www.hradce.cz

Hradce is a municipality and village in České Budějovice District in the South Bohemian Region of the Czech Republic. It has about 100 inhabitants.

Hradce lies approximately 10 kilometres (6 mi) south-west of České Budějovice and 128 km (80 mi) south of Prague.

== Demographics ==
Historical population
Year	Pop.	±%
1869	60	—
1880	54	−10.0%
1890	56	+3.7%
1900	36	−35.7%
1910	33	−8.3%
1921	45	+36.4%
1930	68	+51.1%
1950	44	−35.3%
1961	34	−22.7%
1970	28	−17.6%
1980	16	−42.9%
1991	43	+168.8%
2001	40	−7.0%
2011	72	+80.0%
2021	103	+43.1%
Source: Censuses
