= Vidov =

- Municipality
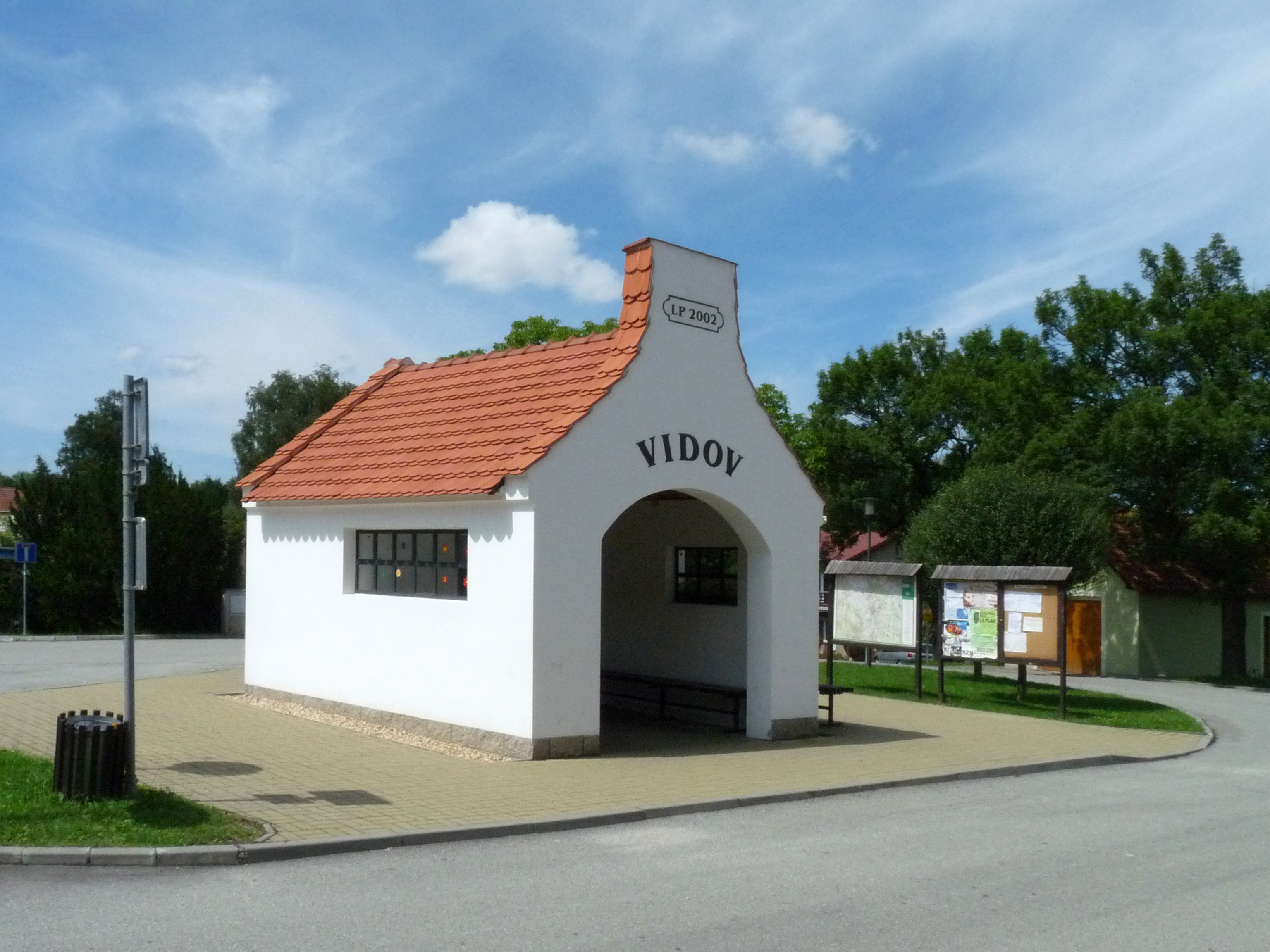
- Bus stop in the centre of Vidov

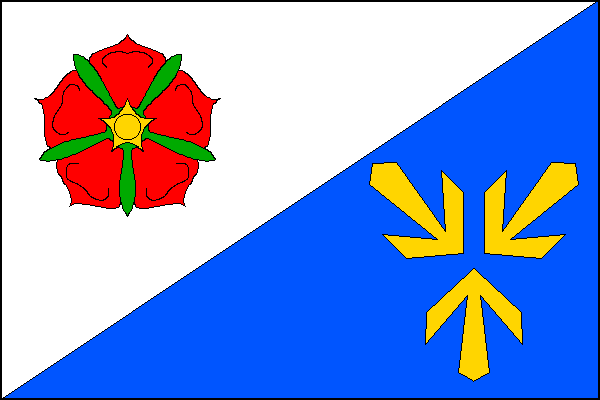
- Flag Coat of arms

- Location in the Czech Republic
- Coordinates: 48°55′37″N 14°29′41″E
- Country: Czech Republic
- Region: South Bohemian
- District: České Budějovice
- First mentioned: 1357

Area
  - Total: 1.23 km^{2} (0.47 sq mi)
- Elevation: 396 m (1,299 ft)

Population (2026-01-01)
  - Total: 599
  - Density: 487/km^{2} (1,260/sq mi)
- Time zone: UTC+1 (CET)
  - Summer (DST): UTC+2 (CEST)
- Postal code: 370 07
- Website: www.vidov.cz

Vidov (German: Wiederpolen) is a municipality and village in České Budějovice District in the South Bohemian Region of the Czech Republic. It has about 600 inhabitants.

Vidov lies approximately 6 kilometres (4 mi) south of České Budějovice and 129 km (80 mi) south of Prague.

== Demographics ==
Historical population
Year	Pop.	±%
1869	54	—
1880	63	+16.7%
1890	57	−9.5%
1900	81	+42.1%
1910	89	+9.9%
1921	100	+12.4%
1930	98	−2.0%
1950	84	−14.3%
1961	84	+0.0%
1970	102	+21.4%
1980	110	+7.8%
1991	274	+149.1%
2001	300	+9.5%
2011	536	+78.7%
2021	601	+12.1%
Source: Censuses
