= Nová Ves (České Budějovice District) =

- Municipality
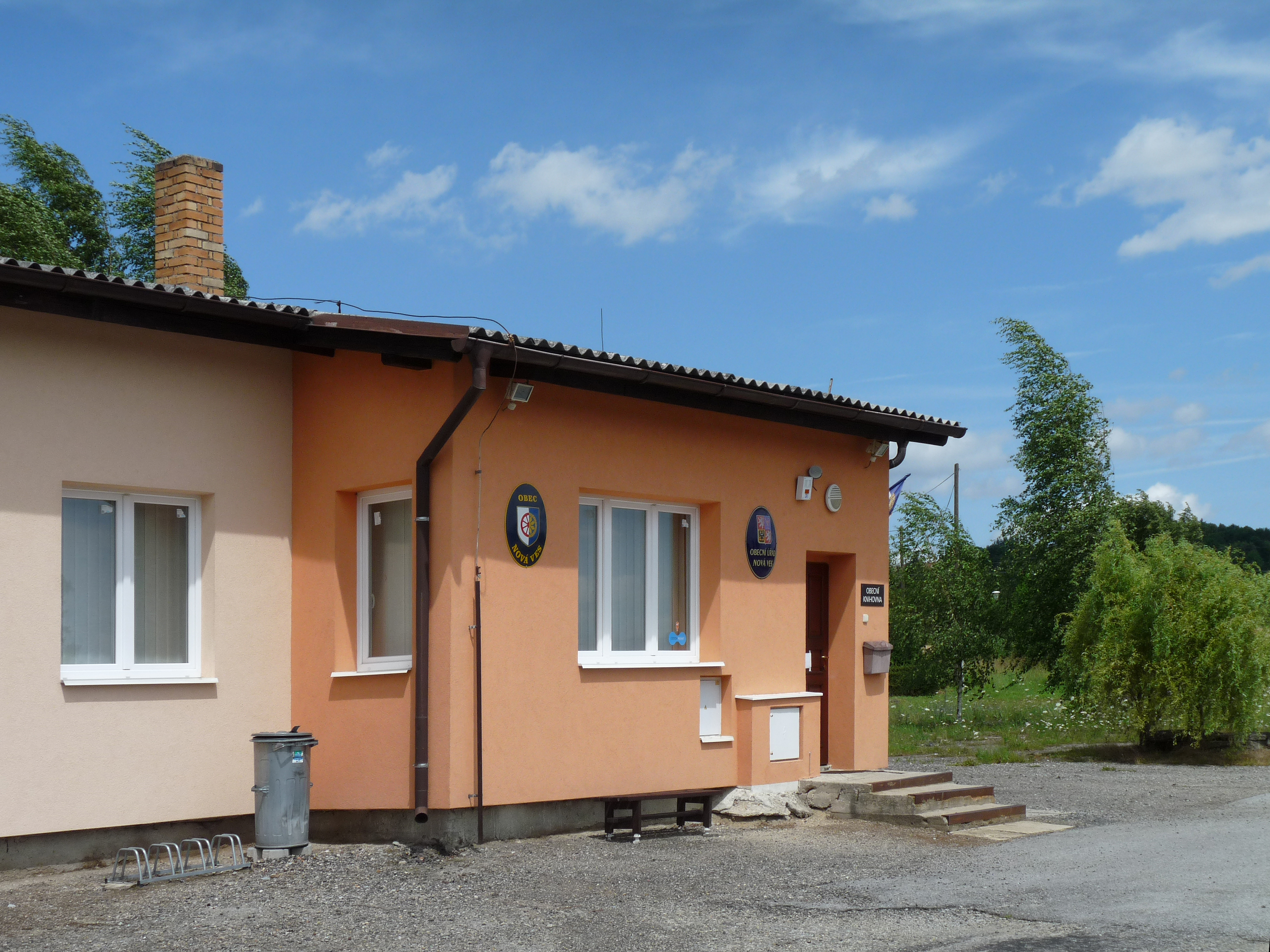
- Municipal office

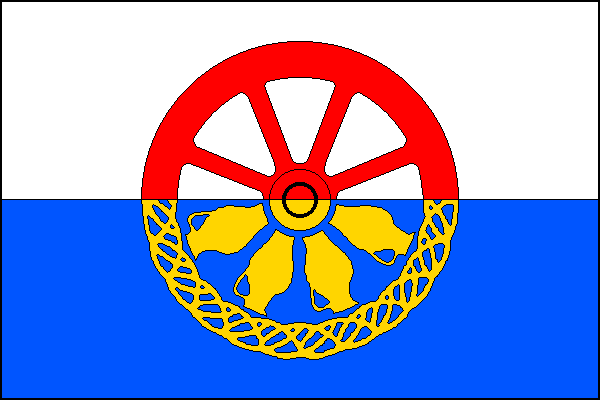
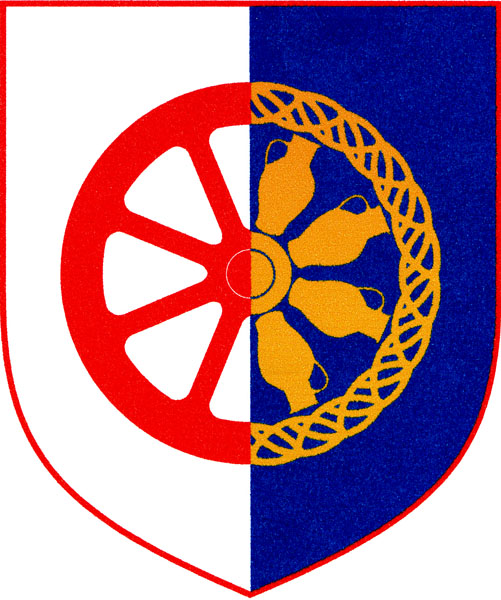
- Flag Coat of arms

- Location in the Czech Republic
- Coordinates: 48°55′14″N 14°31′43″E
- Country: Czech Republic
- Region: South Bohemian
- District: České Budějovice
- First mentioned: 1564

Area
  - Total: 5.86 km^{2} (2.26 sq mi)
- Elevation: 512 m (1,680 ft)

Population (2026-01-01)
  - Total: 784
  - Density: 134/km^{2} (347/sq mi)
- Time zone: UTC+1 (CET)
  - Summer (DST): UTC+2 (CEST)
- Postal code: 373 15
- Website: www.novaves.net

Nová Ves is a municipality and village in České Budějovice District in the South Bohemian Region of the Czech Republic. It has about 800 inhabitants.

Nová Ves lies approximately 8 kilometres (5 mi) south-east of České Budějovice and 130 km (81 mi) south of Prague.

== Administrative division ==
Nová Ves consists of two municipal parts (in brackets population according to the 2021 census):

- Nová Ves (373)
- Hůrka (390)

== History ==
The first written mention of Nová Ves is from 1564. The village was probably established between 1557 and 1564.

== Demographics ==
Historical population
Year	Pop.	±%
1869	259	—
1880	274	+5.8%
1890	286	+4.4%
1900	321	+12.2%
1910	380	+18.4%
1921	393	+3.4%
1930	535	+36.1%
1950	470	−12.1%
1961	521	+10.9%
1970	493	−5.4%
1980	512	+3.9%
1991	490	−4.3%
2001	542	+10.6%
2011	712	+31.4%
2021	763	+7.2%
Source: Censuses
