= Úsilné =

- Municipality
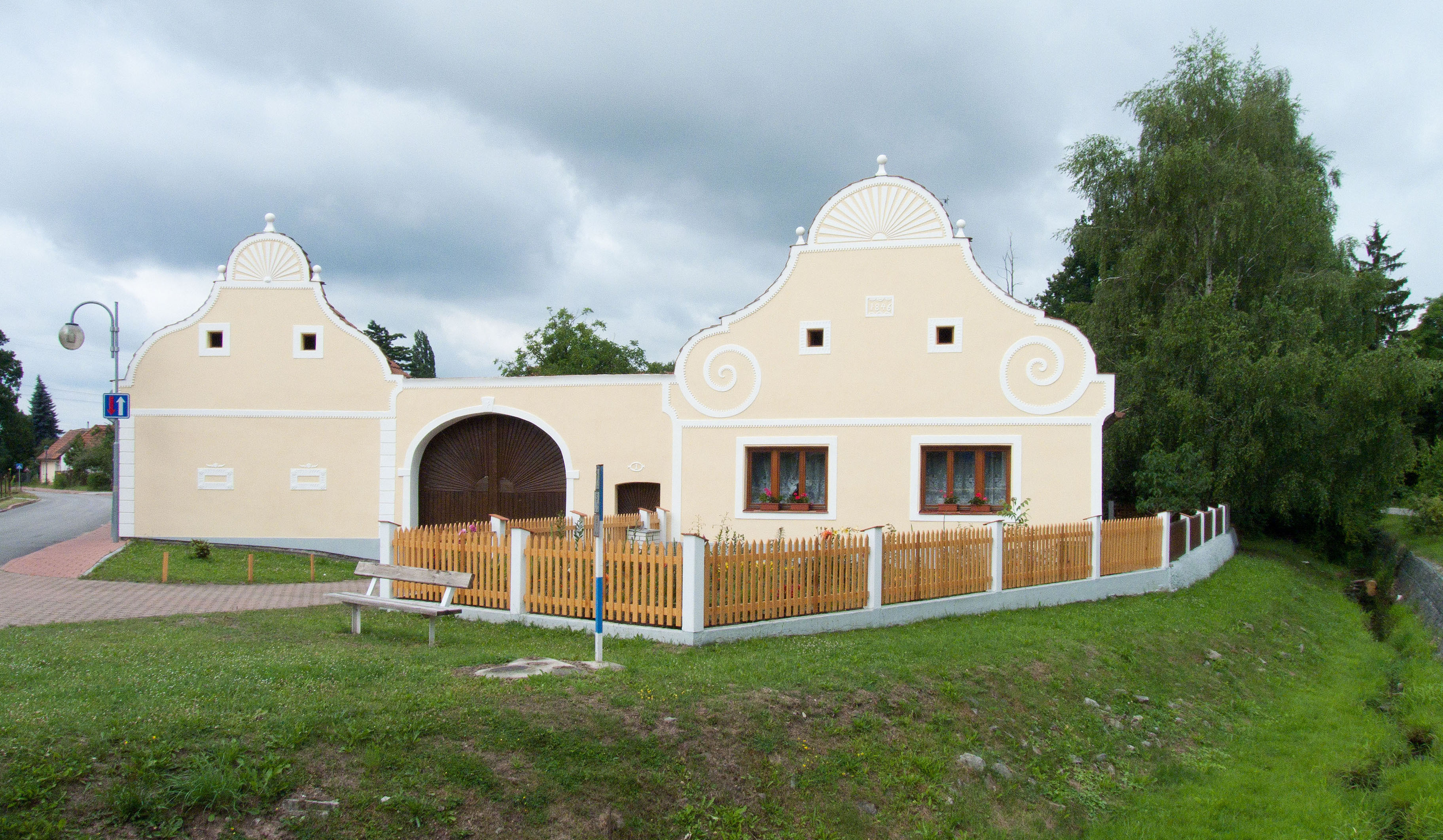
- House No. 1 U Sukdolů

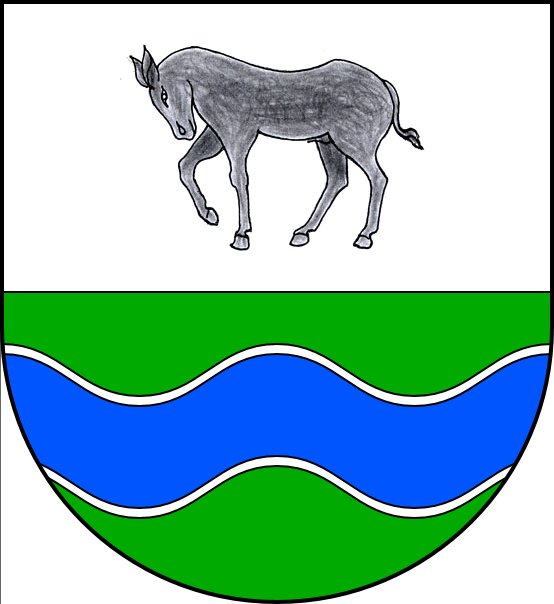
- Flag Coat of arms

- Location in the Czech Republic
- Coordinates: 49°0′48″N 14°30′26″E
- Country: Czech Republic
- Region: South Bohemian
- District: České Budějovice
- First mentioned: 1333

Area
  - Total: 3.03 km^{2} (1.17 sq mi)
- Elevation: 399 m (1,309 ft)

Population (2026-01-01)
  - Total: 497
  - Density: 164/km^{2} (425/sq mi)
- Time zone: UTC+1 (CET)
  - Summer (DST): UTC+2 (CEST)
- Postal code: 370 10
- Website: www.usilne.cz

Úsilné is a municipality and village in České Budějovice District in the South Bohemian Region of the Czech Republic. It has about 500 inhabitants.

Úsilné lies approximately 5 kilometres (3 mi) north-east of České Budějovice and 120 km (75 mi) south of Prague.

== Demographics ==
Historical population
Year	Pop.	±%
1869	277	—
1880	332	+19.9%
1890	350	+5.4%
1900	416	+18.9%
1910	541	+30.0%
1921	568	+5.0%
1930	353	−37.9%
1950	296	−16.1%
1961	269	−9.1%
1970	258	−4.1%
1980	272	+5.4%
1991	292	+7.4%
2001	316	+8.2%
2011	445	+40.8%
2021	508	+14.2%
Source: Censuses
