= Smržov (Jindřichův Hradec District) =

- Municipality
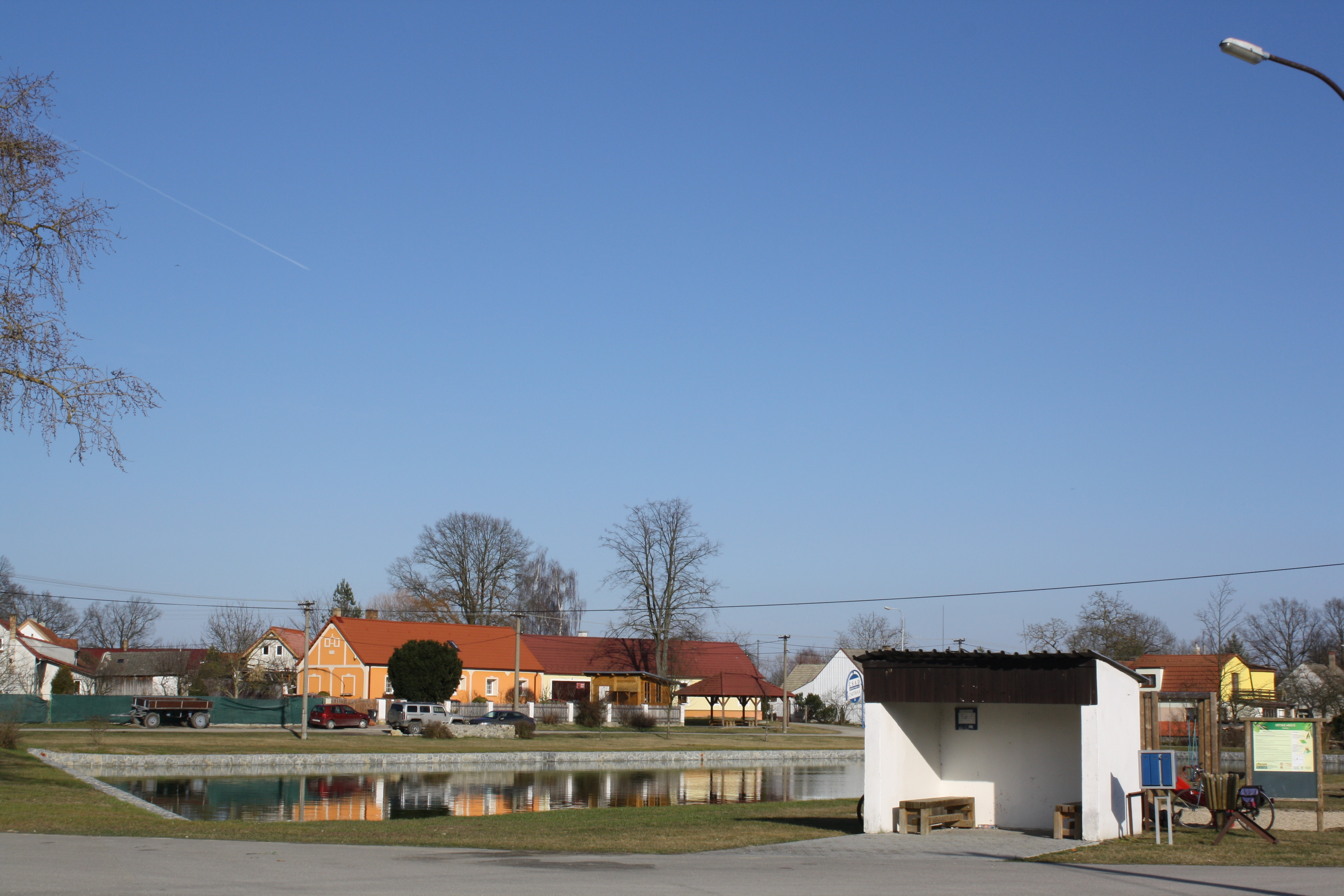
- Centre of Smržov

- Location in the Czech Republic
- Coordinates: 49°4′34″N 14°40′57″E
- Country: Czech Republic
- Region: South Bohemian
- District: Jindřichův Hradec
- First mentioned: 1367

Area
  - Total: 10.90 km^{2} (4.21 sq mi)
- Elevation: 434 m (1,424 ft)

Population (2026-01-01)
  - Total: 110
  - Density: 10/km^{2} (26/sq mi)
- Time zone: UTC+1 (CET)
  - Summer (DST): UTC+2 (CEST)
- Postal code: 378 16
- Website: www.smrzov.eu

Smržov is a municipality and village in Jindřichův Hradec District in the South Bohemian Region of the Czech Republic. It has about 100 inhabitants.

Smržov lies approximately 26 kilometres (16 mi) west of Jindřichův Hradec, 18 km (11 mi) north-east of České Budějovice, and 114 km (71 mi) south of Prague.

== Demographics ==
Historical population
Year	Pop.	±%
1869	299	—
1880	342	+14.4%
1890	347	+1.5%
1900	342	−1.4%
1910	315	−7.9%
1921	313	−0.6%
1930	291	−7.0%
1950	228	−21.6%
1961	220	−3.5%
1970	184	−16.4%
1980	148	−19.6%
1991	125	−15.5%
2001	93	−25.6%
2011	108	+16.1%
2021	113	+4.6%
Source: Censuses
