= Doubravice (České Budějovice District) =

- Municipality
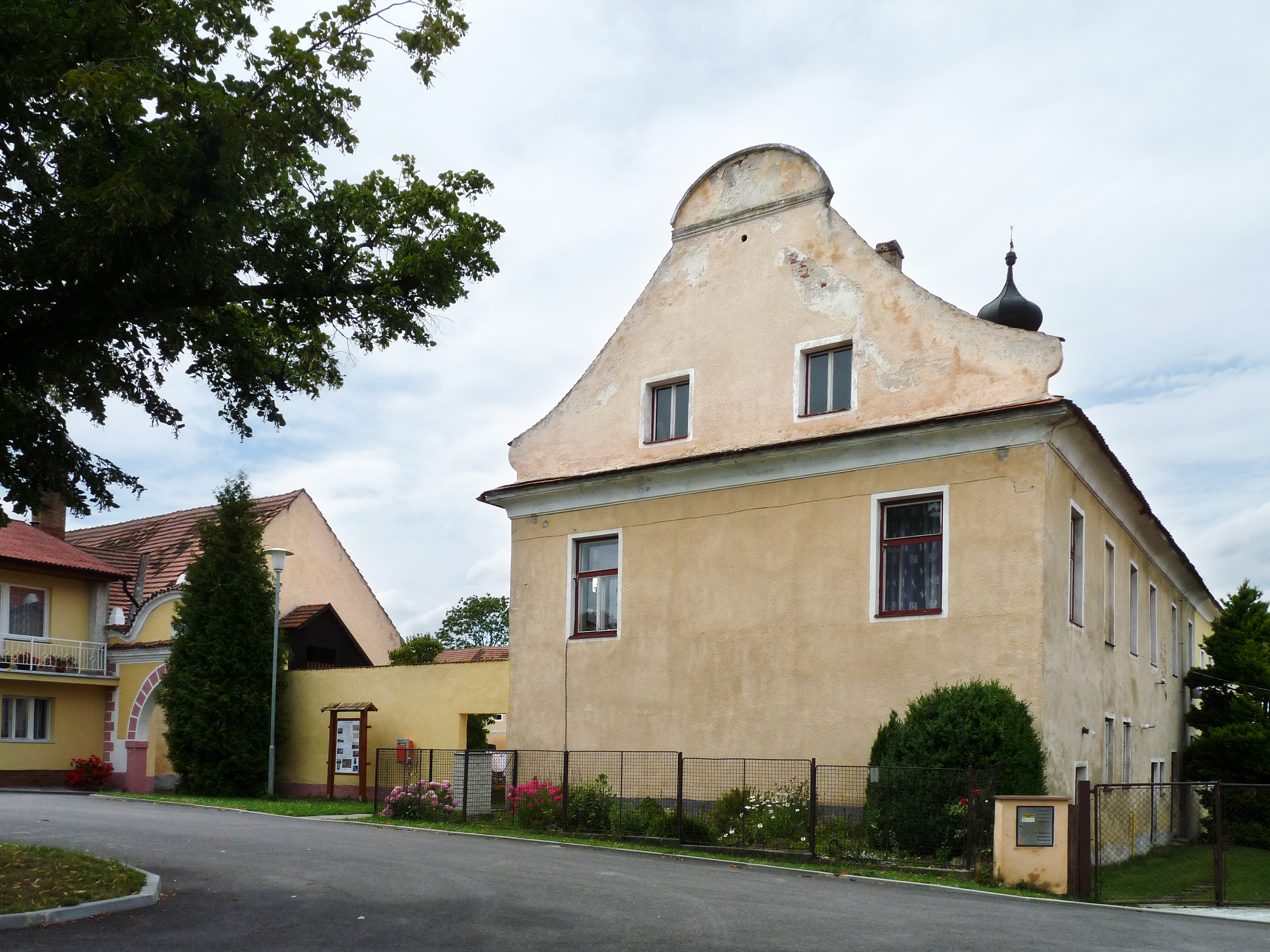
- Doubravice Castle

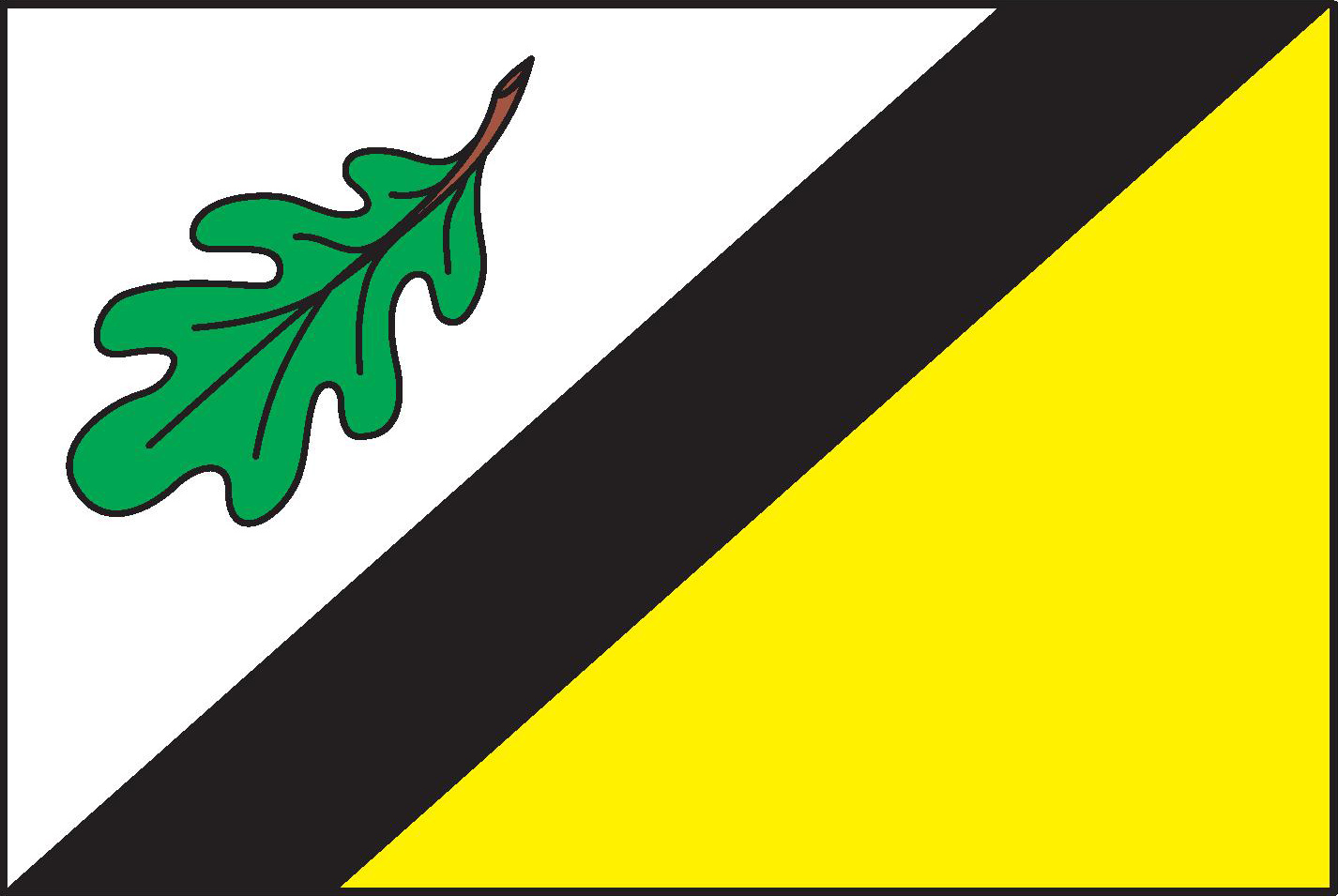
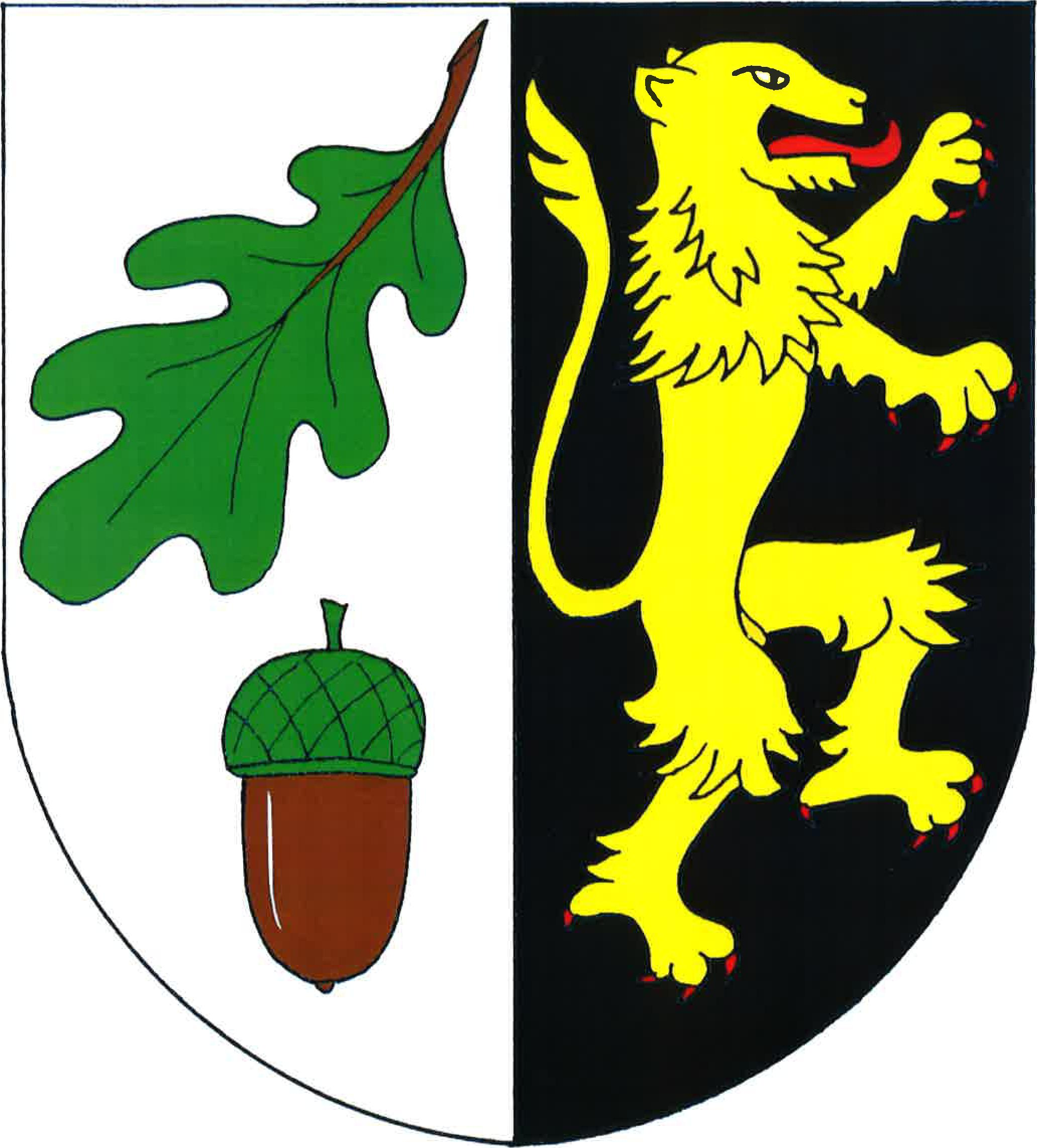
- Flag Coat of arms

- Location in the Czech Republic
- Coordinates: 48°56′9″N 14°30′39″E
- Country: Czech Republic
- Region: South Bohemian
- District: České Budějovice
- First mentioned: 1267

Area
  - Total: 1.82 km^{2} (0.70 sq mi)
- Elevation: 490 m (1,610 ft)

Population (2026-01-01)
  - Total: 337
  - Density: 185/km^{2} (480/sq mi)
- Time zone: UTC+1 (CET)
  - Summer (DST): UTC+2 (CEST)
- Postal code: 370 06
- Website: www.obecdoubravice.cz

Doubravice is a municipality and village in České Budějovice District in the South Bohemian Region of the Czech Republic. It has about 300 inhabitants.

Doubravice lies approximately 6 kilometres (4 mi) south-east of České Budějovice and 128 km (80 mi) south of Prague.

== Demographics ==
Historical population
Year	Pop.	±%
1869	164	—
1880	176	+7.3%
1890	206	+17.0%
1900	245	+18.9%
1910	285	+16.3%
1921	278	−2.5%
1930	237	−14.7%
1950	167	−29.5%
1961	163	−2.4%
1970	148	−9.2%
1980	145	−2.0%
1991	174	+20.0%
2001	187	+7.5%
2011	304	+62.6%
2021	325	+6.9%
Source: Censuses
