= Dubičné =

- Municipality
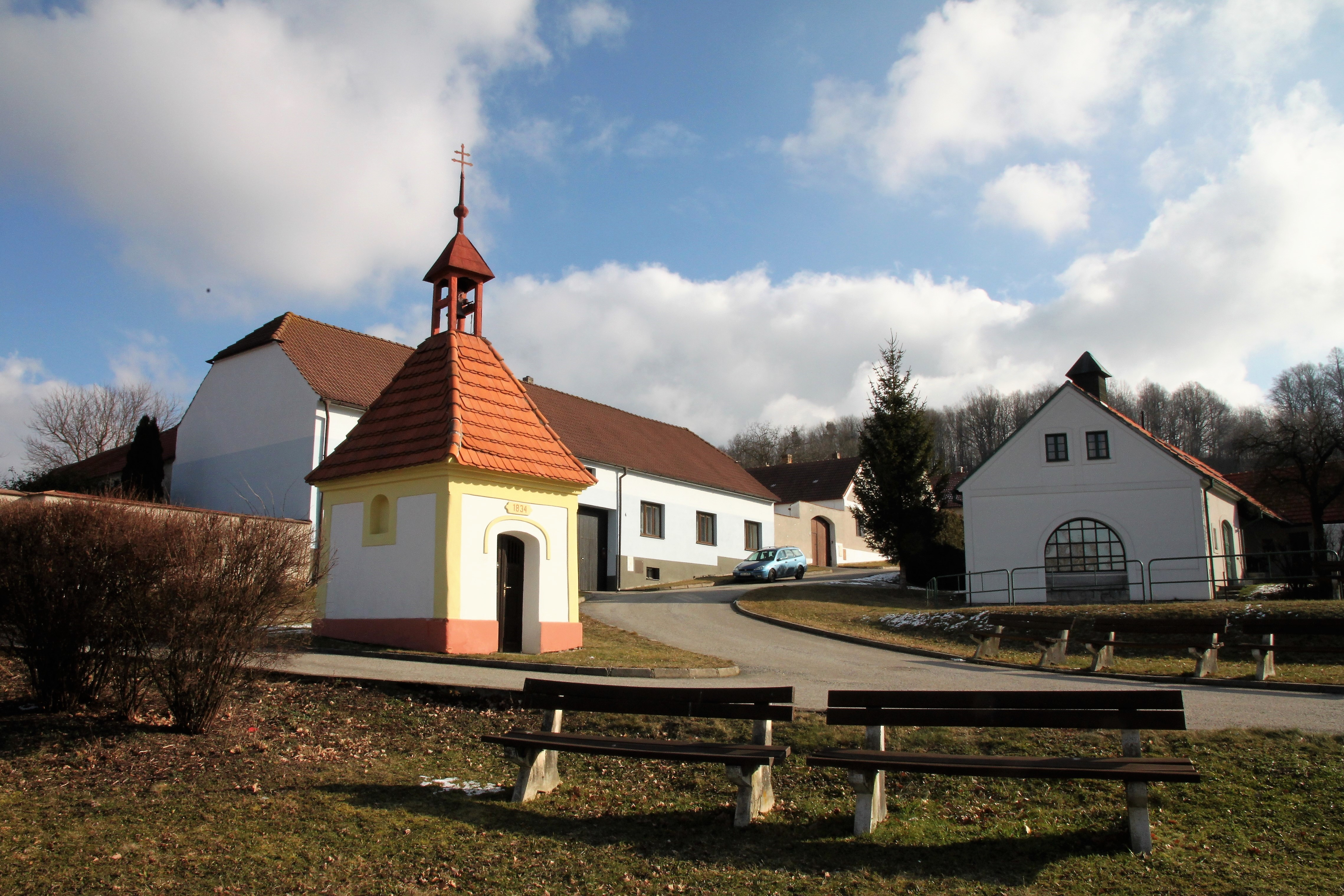
- Chapel of the Virgin Mary and Saints Anthony of Padua and Wenceslaus

- Flag Coat of arms

- Location in the Czech Republic
- Coordinates: 48°58′52″N 14°32′20″E
- Country: Czech Republic
- Region: South Bohemian
- District: České Budějovice
- First mentioned: 1377

Area
  - Total: 3.26 km^{2} (1.26 sq mi)
- Elevation: 476 m (1,562 ft)

Population (2026-01-01)
  - Total: 417
  - Density: 128/km^{2} (331/sq mi)
- Time zone: UTC+1 (CET)
  - Summer (DST): UTC+2 (CEST)
- Postal code: 373 71
- Website: www.dubicne.cz

Dubičné (German: Dubiken) is a municipality and village in České Budějovice District in the South Bohemian Region of the Czech Republic. It has about 400 inhabitants.

Dubičné lies approximately 5 kilometres (3 mi) east of České Budějovice and 123 km (76 mi) south of Prague.

== Demographics ==
Historical population
Year	Pop.	±%
1869	195	—
1880	204	+4.6%
1890	232	+13.7%
1900	271	+16.8%
1910	280	+3.3%
1921	287	+2.5%
1930	234	−18.5%
1950	224	−4.3%
1961	241	+7.6%
1970	184	−23.7%
1980	213	+15.8%
1991	268	+25.8%
2001	264	−1.5%
2011	345	+30.7%
2021	424	+22.9%
Source: Censuses
