= Hvozdec (České Budějovice District) =

- Municipality
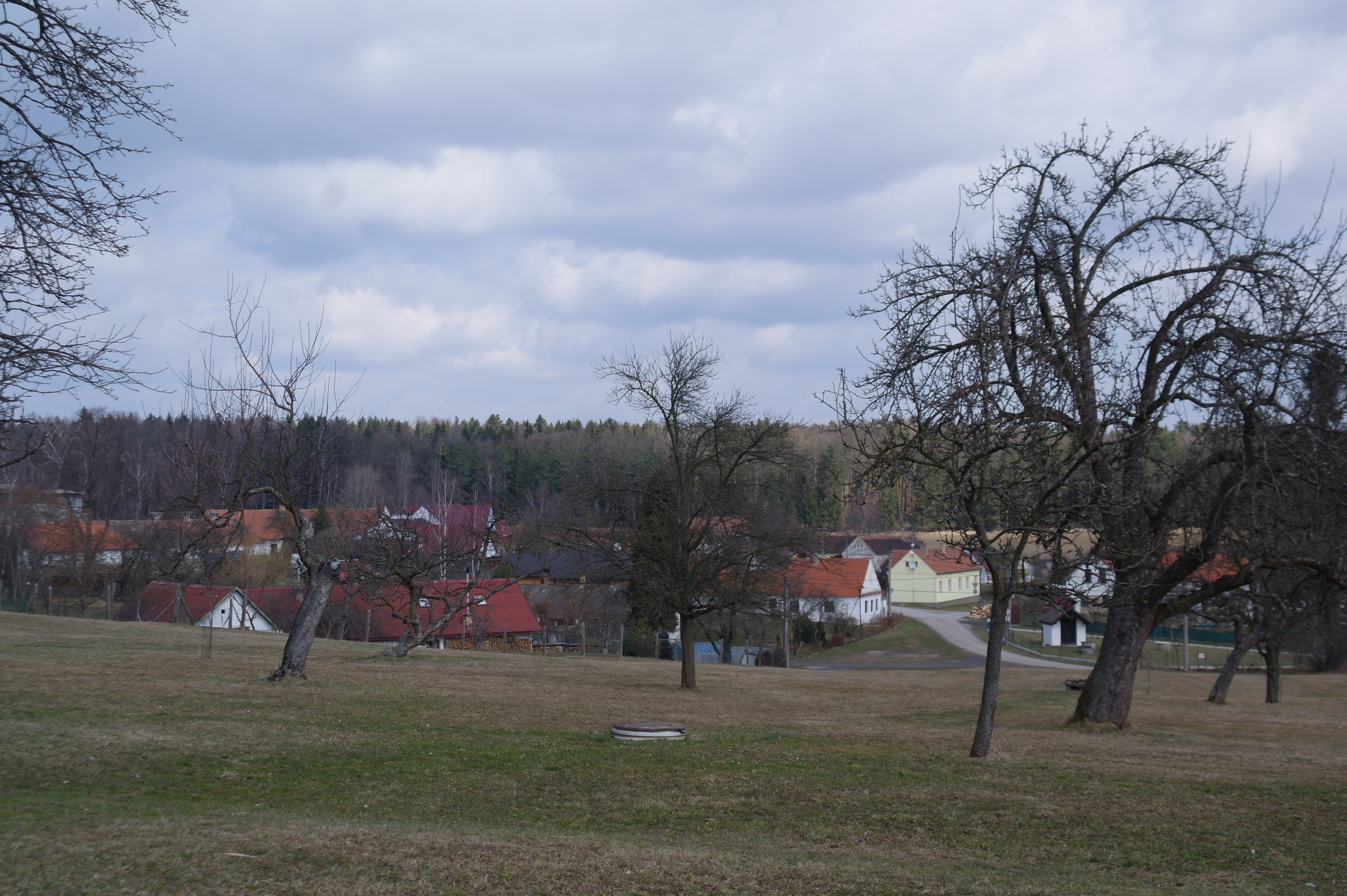
- Eastern part of Hvozdec

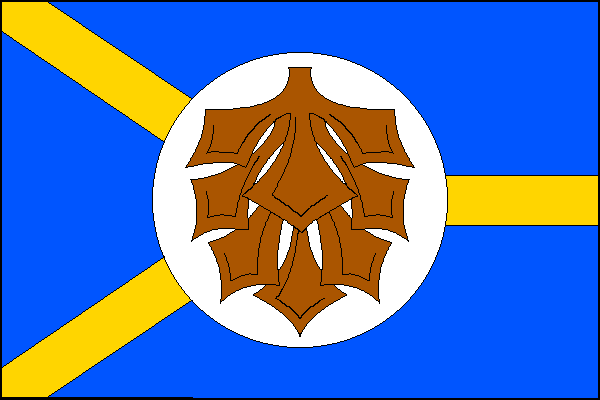
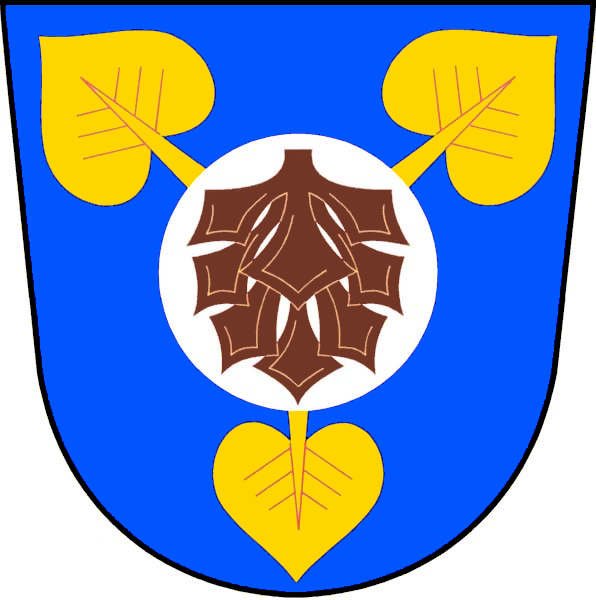
- Flag Coat of arms

- Location in the Czech Republic
- Coordinates: 48°59′33″N 14°37′38″E
- Country: Czech Republic
- Region: South Bohemian
- District: České Budějovice
- First mentioned: 1362

Area
  - Total: 2.38 km^{2} (0.92 sq mi)
- Elevation: 490 m (1,610 ft)

Population (2026-01-01)
  - Total: 147
  - Density: 61.8/km^{2} (160/sq mi)
- Time zone: UTC+1 (CET)
  - Summer (DST): UTC+2 (CEST)
- Postal code: 373 72
- Website: www.obechvozdec.cz

Hvozdec is a municipality and village in České Budějovice District in the South Bohemian Region of the Czech Republic. It has about 100 inhabitants.

Hvozdec lies approximately 12 kilometres (7 mi) east of České Budějovice and 123 km (76 mi) south of Prague.

== Demographics ==
Historical population
Year	Pop.	±%
1869	137	—
1880	136	−0.7%
1890	150	+10.3%
1900	152	+1.3%
1910	166	+9.2%
1921	162	−2.4%
1930	150	−7.4%
1950	133	−11.3%
1961	113	−15.0%
1970	85	−24.8%
1980	76	−10.6%
1991	63	−17.1%
2001	60	−4.8%
2011	108	+80.0%
2021	136	+25.9%
Source: Censuses
