= Vráto =

- Municipality
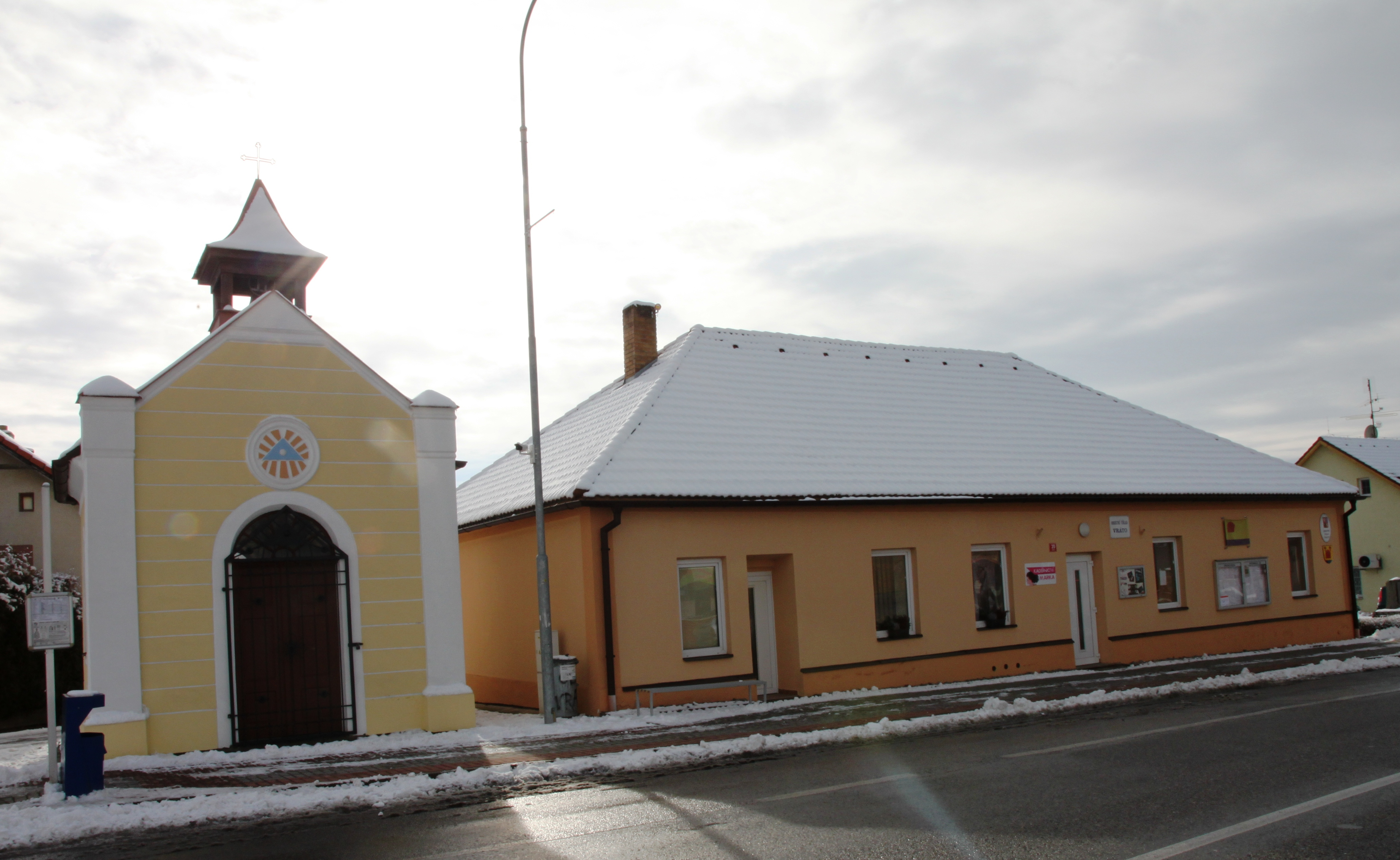
- Chapel of Saint Wenceslaus and municipal office

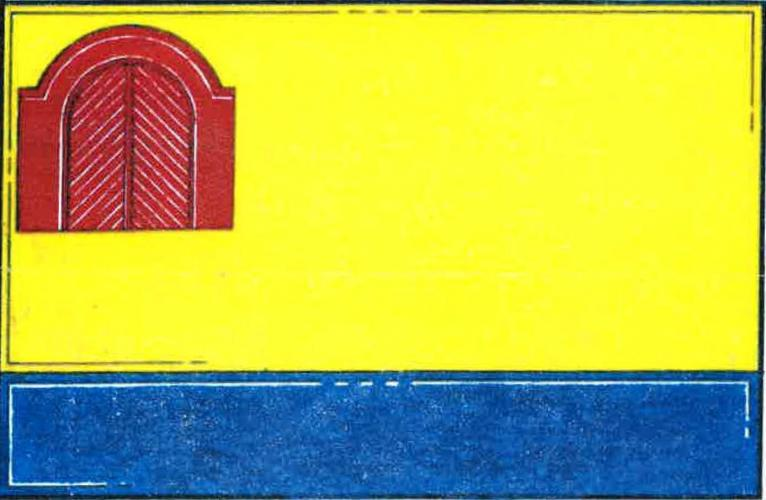
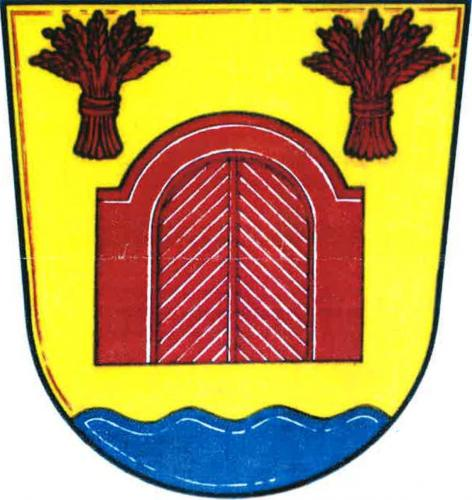
- Flag Coat of arms

- Location in the Czech Republic
- Coordinates: 48°59′17″N 14°31′37″E
- Country: Czech Republic
- Region: South Bohemian
- District: České Budějovice
- First mentioned: 1375

Area
  - Total: 1.53 km^{2} (0.59 sq mi)
- Elevation: 405 m (1,329 ft)

Population (2026-01-01)
  - Total: 512
  - Density: 335/km^{2} (867/sq mi)
- Time zone: UTC+1 (CET)
  - Summer (DST): UTC+2 (CEST)
- Postal code: 370 01
- Website: www.vrato.cz

Vráto (German: Brod) is a municipality and village in České Budějovice District in the South Bohemian Region of the Czech Republic. It has about 500 inhabitants.

Vráto lies approximately 5 kilometres (3 mi) east of České Budějovice and 123 km (76 mi) south of Prague.

== Demographics ==
Historical population
Year	Pop.	±%
1869	245	—
1880	238	−2.9%
1890	387	+62.6%
1900	688	+77.8%
1910	837	+21.7%
1921	1,029	+22.9%
1930	1,100	+6.9%
1950	817	−25.7%
1961	217	−73.4%
1970	163	−24.9%
1980	171	+4.9%
1991	186	+8.8%
2001	200	+7.5%
2011	303	+51.5%
2021	448	+47.9%
Source: Censuses
