= Vlkov (České Budějovice District) =

- Municipality
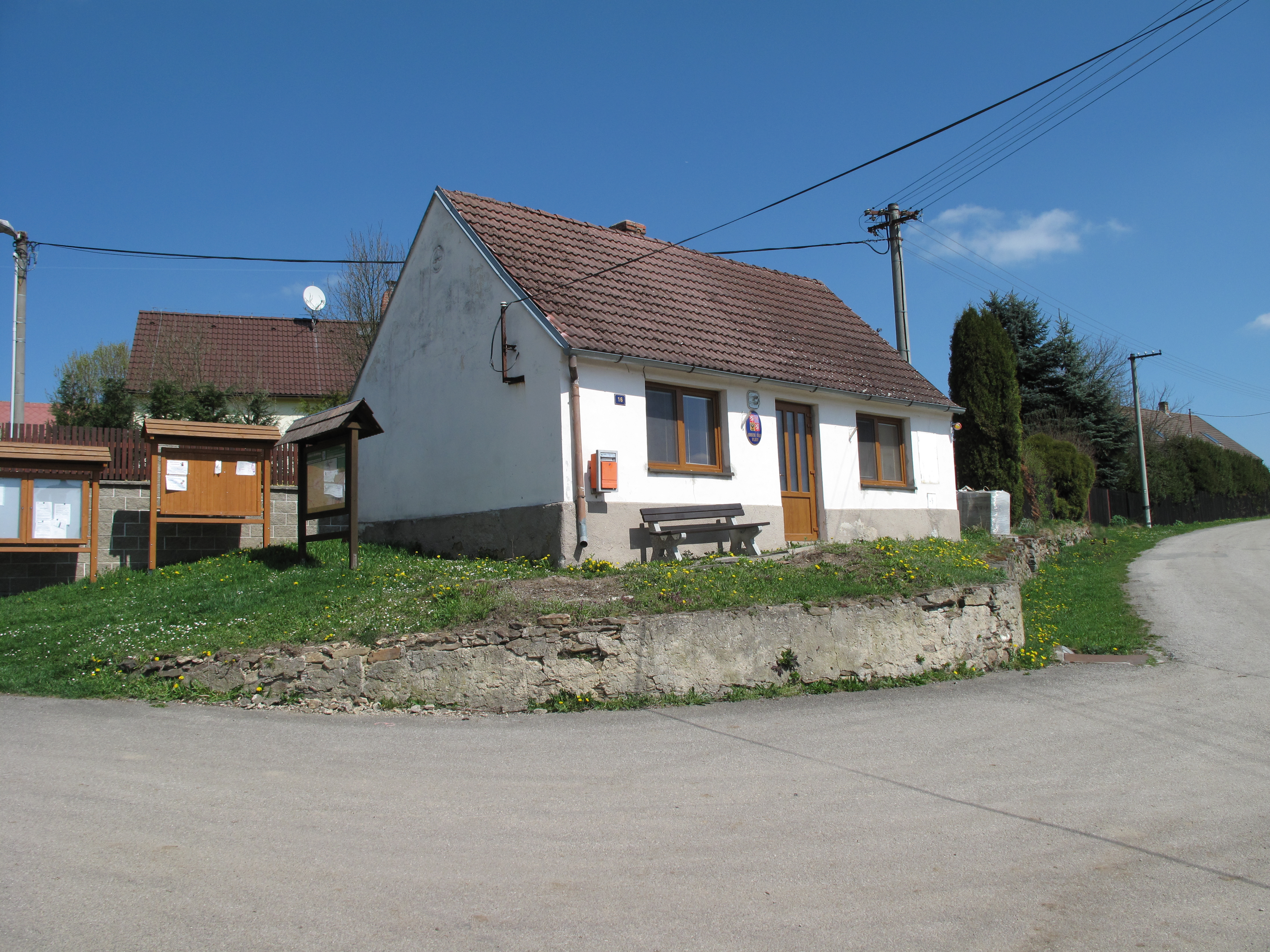
- Municipal office

- Location in the Czech Republic
- Coordinates: 49°6′48″N 14°31′20″E
- Country: Czech Republic
- Region: South Bohemian
- District: České Budějovice
- First mentioned: 1443

Area
  - Total: 5.76 km^{2} (2.22 sq mi)
- Elevation: 500 m (1,600 ft)

Population (2026-01-01)
  - Total: 55
  - Density: 9.5/km^{2} (25/sq mi)
- Time zone: UTC+1 (CET)
  - Summer (DST): UTC+2 (CEST)
- Postal code: 373 41
- Website: www.obecvlkov.eu

Vlkov is a municipality and village in České Budějovice District in the South Bohemian Region of the Czech Republic. It has about 60 inhabitants.

Vlkov lies approximately 16 kilometres (10 mi) north of České Budějovice and 109 km (68 mi) south of Prague.

== Demographics ==
Historical population
Year	Pop.	±%
1869	116	—
1880	157	+35.3%
1890	126	−19.7%
1900	126	+0.0%
1910	126	+0.0%
1921	141	+11.9%
1930	125	−11.3%
1950	87	−30.4%
1961	90	+3.4%
1970	66	−26.7%
1980	43	−34.8%
1991	28	−34.9%
2001	24	−14.3%
2011	25	+4.2%
2021	43	+72.0%
Source: Censuses
