= Hlincová Hora =

- Municipality
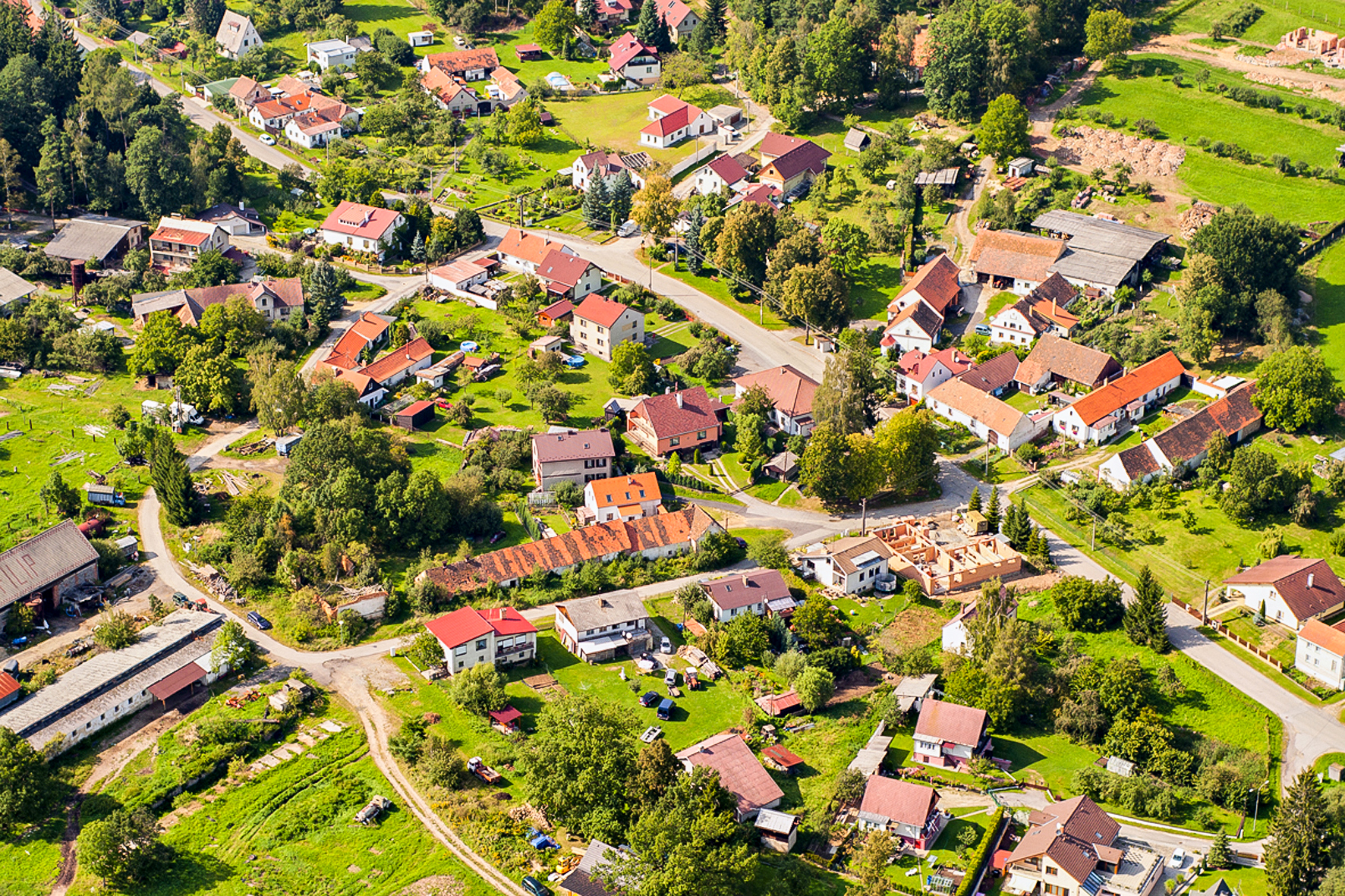
- Aerial view

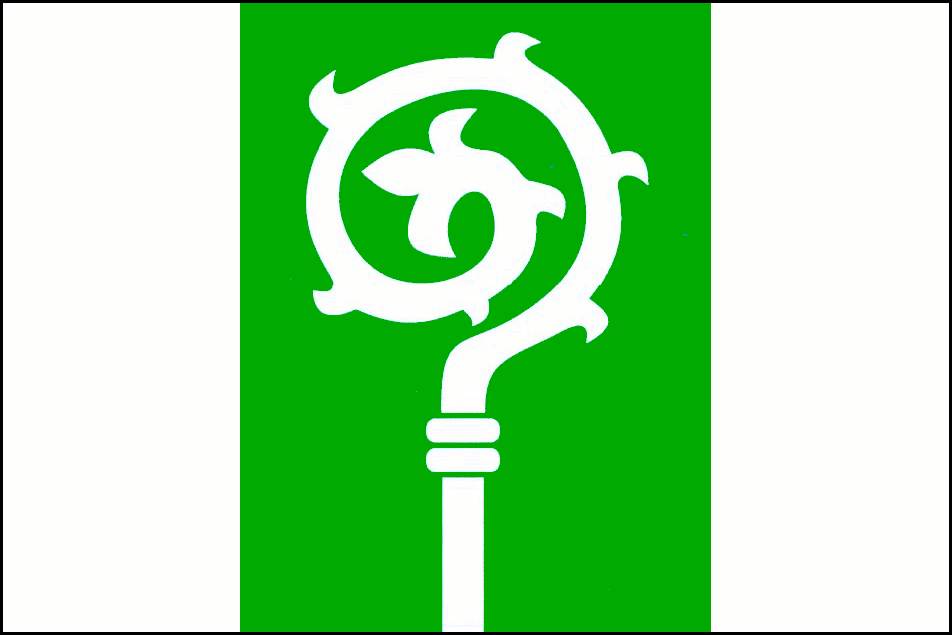
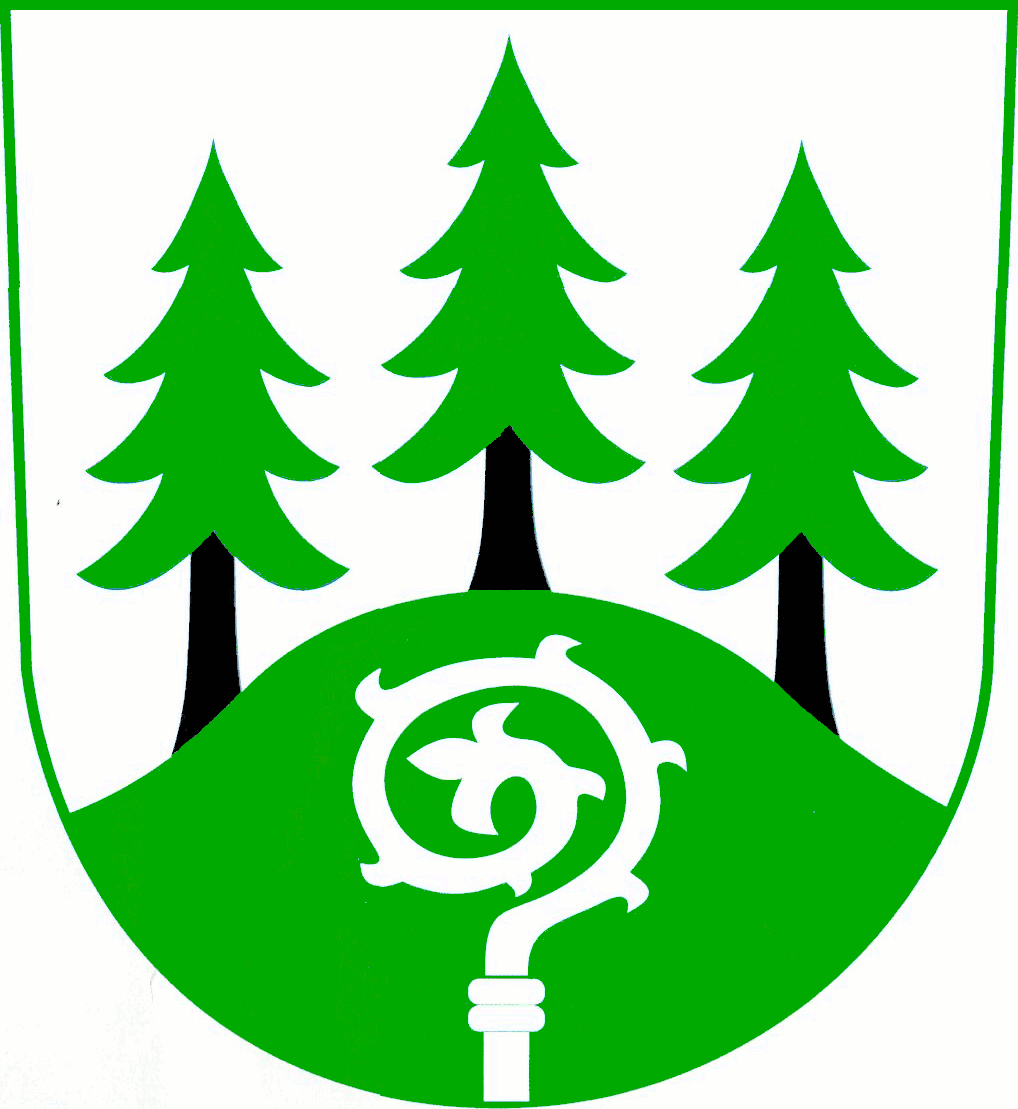
- Flag Coat of arms

- Location in the Czech Republic
- Coordinates: 48°59′1″N 14°33′52″E
- Country: Czech Republic
- Region: South Bohemian
- District: České Budějovice
- First mentioned: 1398

Area
  - Total: 3.36 km^{2} (1.30 sq mi)
- Elevation: 550 m (1,800 ft)

Population (2026-01-01)
  - Total: 493
  - Density: 147/km^{2} (380/sq mi)
- Time zone: UTC+1 (CET)
  - Summer (DST): UTC+2 (CEST)
- Postal code: 373 71
- Website: www.hlincovahora.cz

Hlincová Hora (German: Pfaffendorf) is a municipality and village in České Budějovice District in the South Bohemian Region of the Czech Republic. It has about 500 inhabitants.

Hlincová Hora lies approximately 7 kilometres (4 mi) east of České Budějovice and 123 km (76 mi) south of Prague.

== Demographics ==
Historical population
Year	Pop.	±%
1869	98	—
1880	103	+5.1%
1890	124	+20.4%
1900	137	+10.5%
1910	125	−8.8%
1921	128	+2.4%
1930	118	−7.8%
1950	88	−25.4%
1961	84	−4.5%
1970	62	−26.2%
1980	74	+19.4%
1991	90	+21.6%
2001	213	+136.7%
2011	371	+74.2%
2021	445	+19.9%
Source: Censuses
