= Borovnice (Žďár nad Sázavou District) =

- Municipality
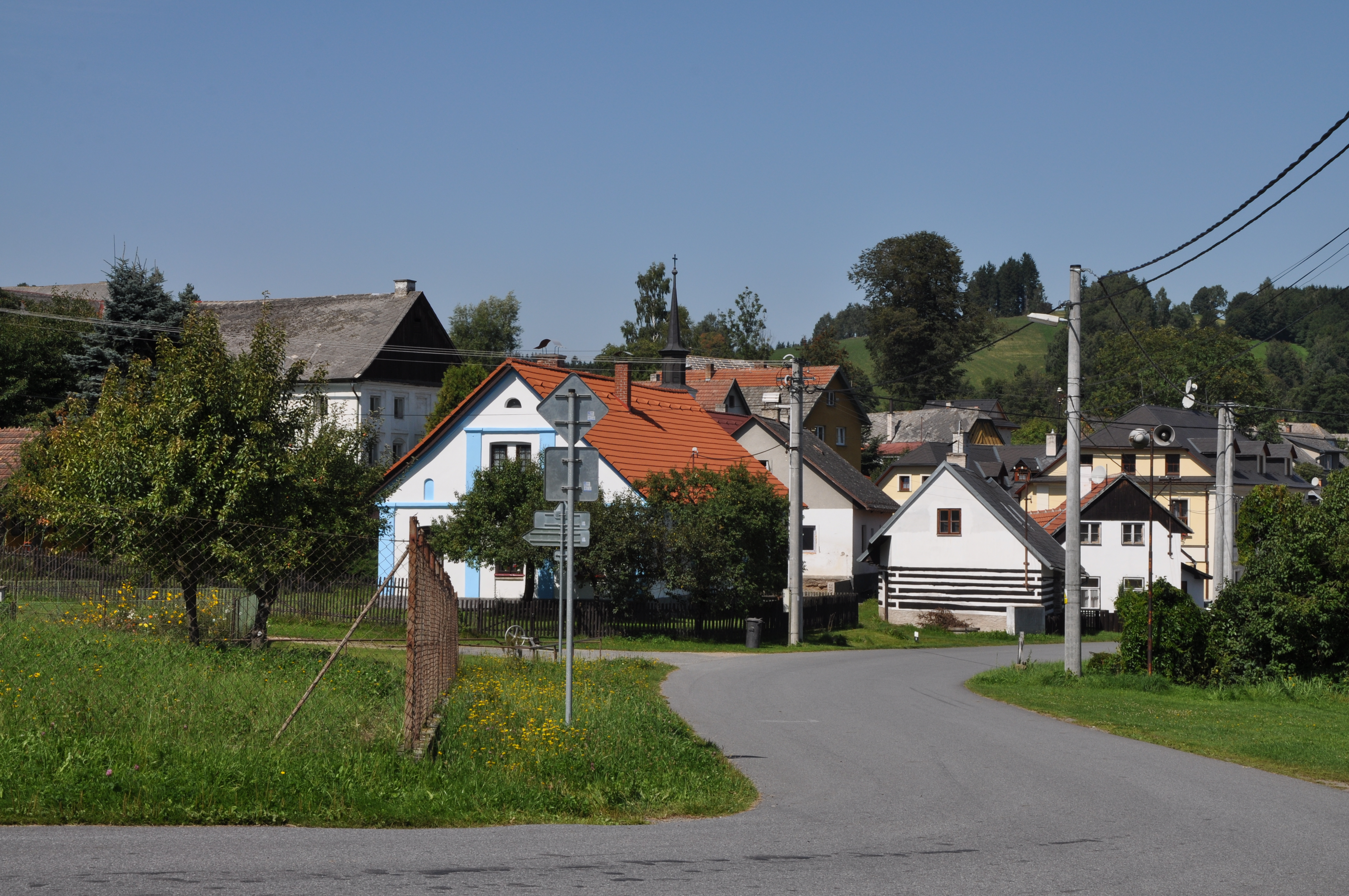
- General view

- Flag Coat of arms

- Location in the Czech Republic
- Coordinates: 49°40′2″N 16°12′9″E
- Country: Czech Republic
- Region: Vysočina
- District: Žďár nad Sázavou
- First mentioned: 1350

Area
  - Total: 9.07 km^{2} (3.50 sq mi)
- Elevation: 515 m (1,690 ft)

Population (2026-01-01)
  - Total: 195
  - Density: 21.5/km^{2} (55.7/sq mi)
- Time zone: UTC+1 (CET)
  - Summer (DST): UTC+2 (CEST)
- Postal code: 592 42
- Website: borovnice-zr.cz

Borovnice (Czech pronunciation: [ˈborovɲɪtsɛ]; German: Borownitz) is a municipality and village in Žďár nad Sázavou District in the Vysočina Region of the Czech Republic. It has about 200 inhabitants.

Borovnice lies approximately 21 kilometres (13 mi) north-east of Žďár nad Sázavou, 53 km (33 mi) north-east of Jihlava, and 136 km (85 mi) east of Prague.

== Demographics ==
Historical population
Year	Pop.	±%
1869	523	—
1880	565	+8.0%
1890	575	+1.8%
1900	558	−3.0%
1910	567	+1.6%
1921	524	−7.6%
1930	478	−8.8%
1950	383	−19.9%
1961	361	−5.7%
1970	327	−9.4%
1980	270	−17.4%
1991	225	−16.7%
2001	197	−12.4%
2011	173	−12.2%
2021	171	−1.2%
Source: Censuses
