= Strážkovice =

- Municipality
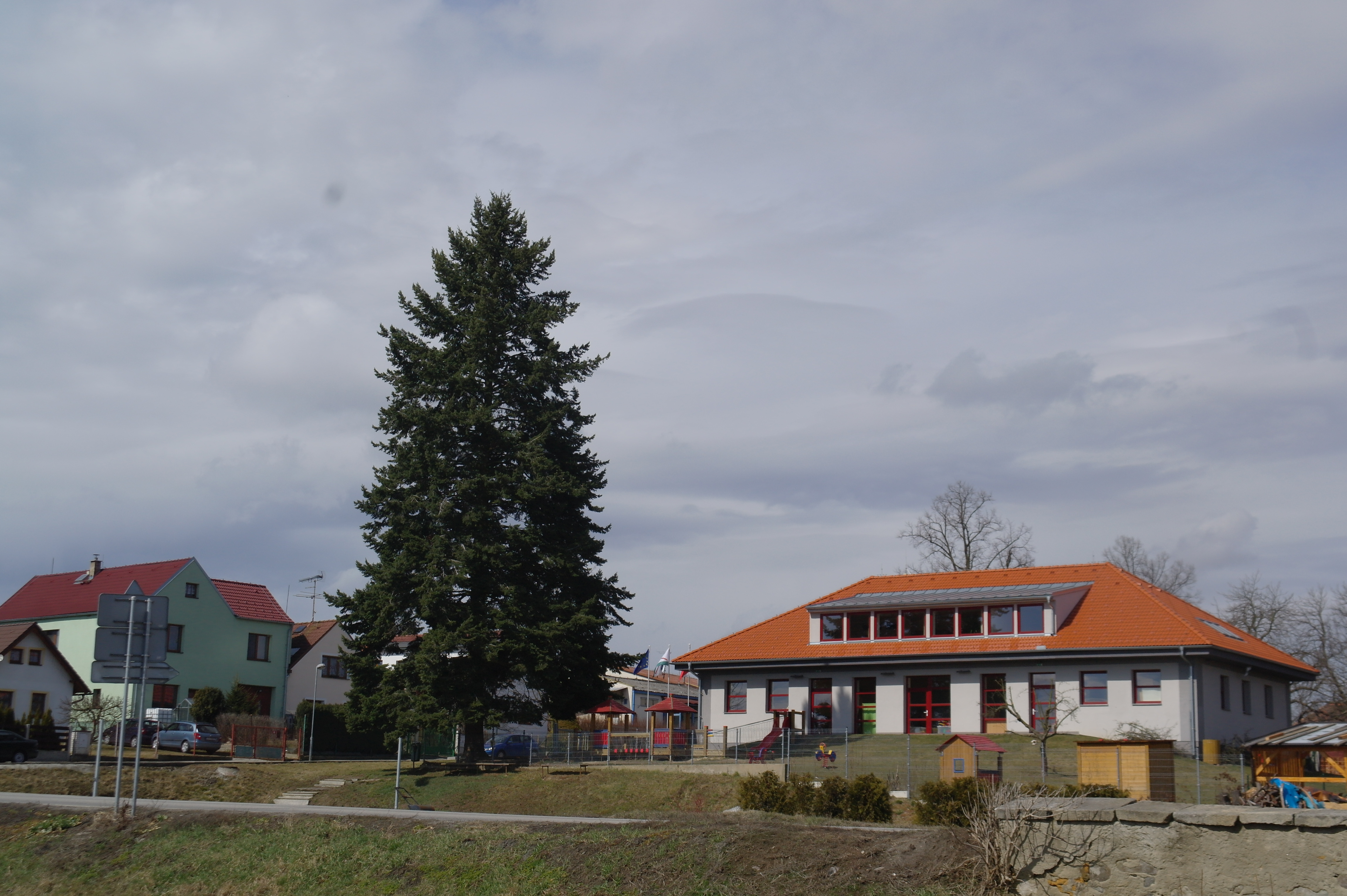
- Centre of Strážkovice with the municipal office

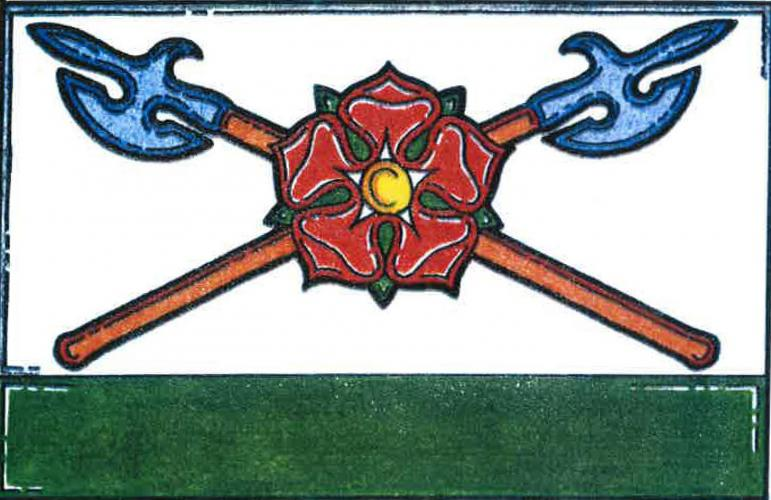
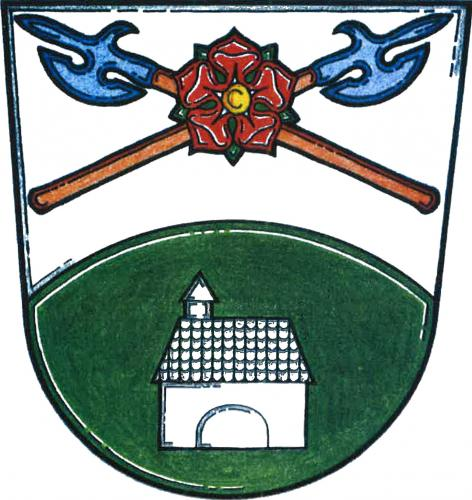
- Flag Coat of arms

- Location in the Czech Republic
- Coordinates: 48°53′59″N 14°34′10″E
- Country: Czech Republic
- Region: South Bohemian
- District: České Budějovice
- First mentioned: 1394

Area
  - Total: 10.07 km^{2} (3.89 sq mi)
- Elevation: 535 m (1,755 ft)

Population (2026-01-01)
  - Total: 538
  - Density: 53.4/km^{2} (138/sq mi)
- Time zone: UTC+1 (CET)
  - Summer (DST): UTC+2 (CEST)
- Postal code: 374 01
- Website: www.strazkovice.cz

Strážkovice is a municipality and village in České Budějovice District in the South Bohemian Region of the Czech Republic. It has about 500 inhabitants.

Strážkovice lies approximately 12 kilometres (7 mi) south-east of České Budějovice and 133 km (83 mi) south of Prague.

== Administrative division ==
Strážkovice consists of three municipal parts (in brackets population according to the 2021 census):

- Strážkovice (428)
- Lomec (63)
- Řevňovice (29)

== Demographics ==
Historical population
Year	Pop.	±%
1869	545	—
1880	607	+11.4%
1890	661	+8.9%
1900	646	−2.3%
1910	634	−1.9%
1921	599	−5.5%
1930	567	−5.3%
1950	461	−18.7%
1961	446	−3.3%
1970	385	−13.7%
1980	372	−3.4%
1991	334	−10.2%
2001	345	+3.3%
2011	425	+23.2%
2021	520	+22.4%
Source: Censuses
