= Zvíkov (České Budějovice District) =

- Municipality
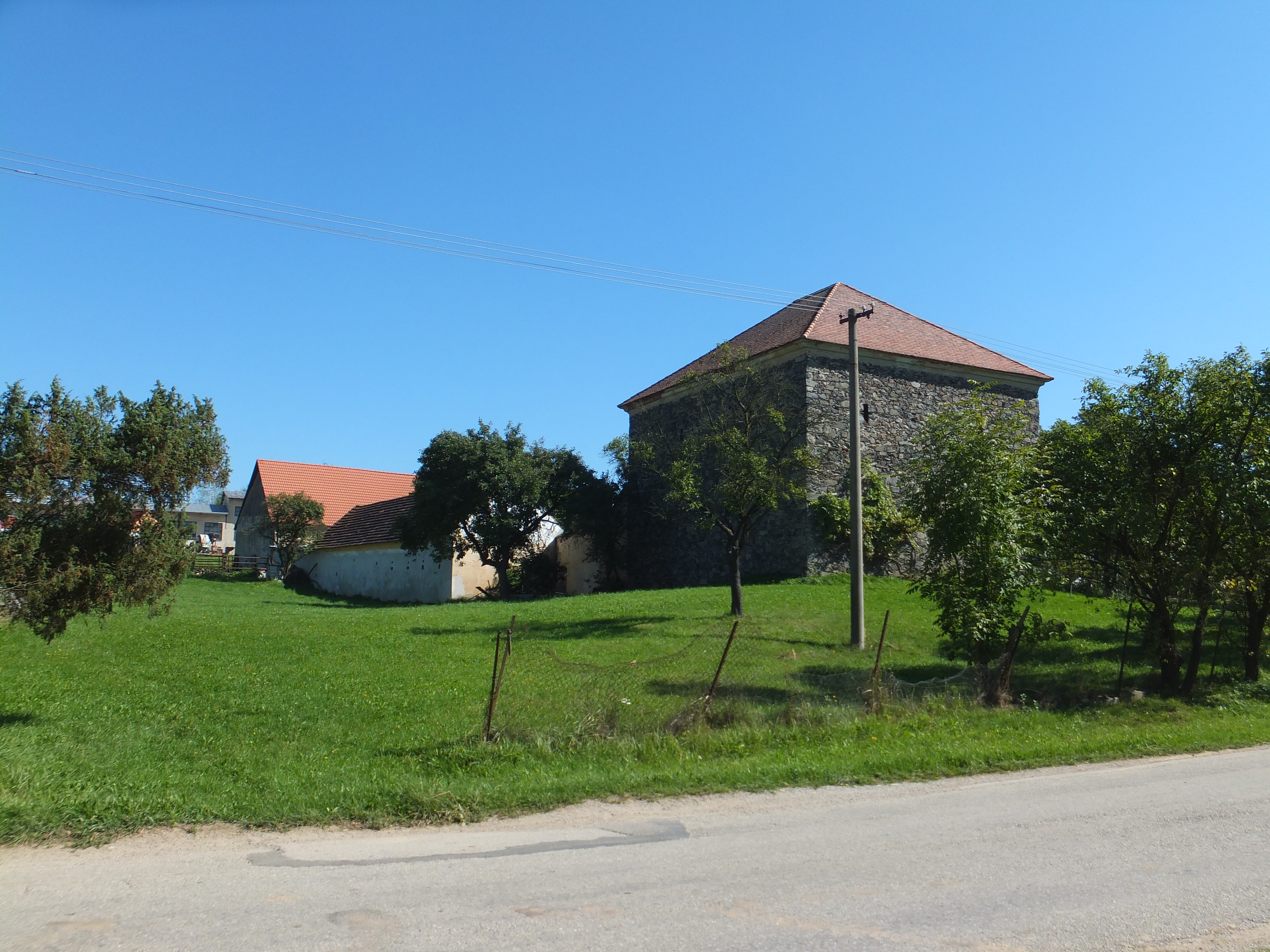
- Former fortress

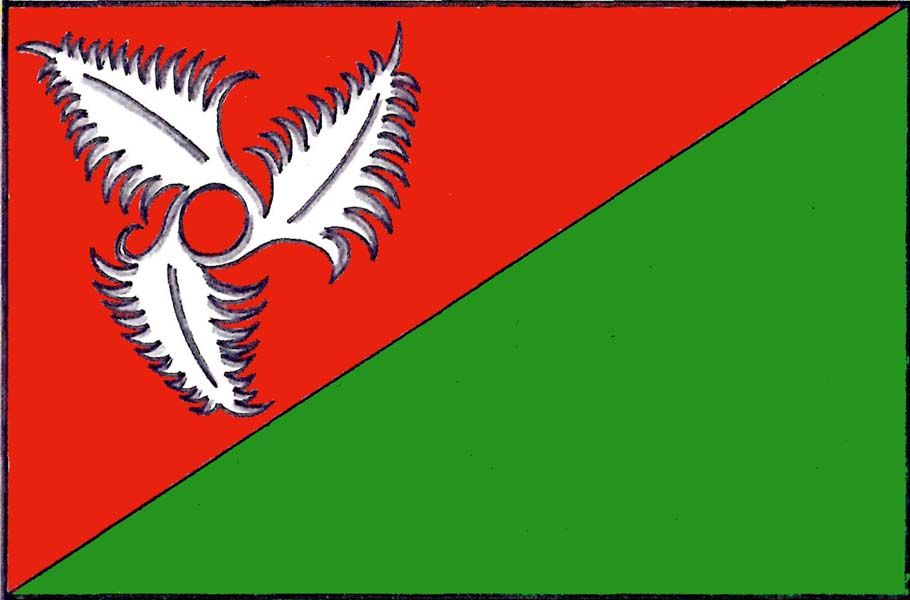
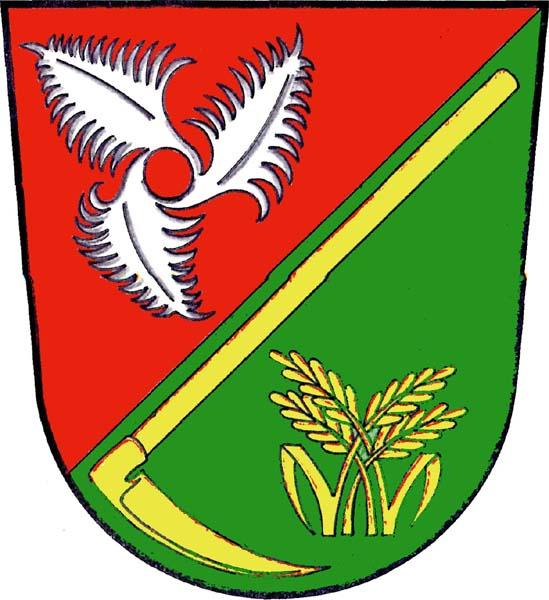
- Flag Coat of arms

- Location in the Czech Republic
- Coordinates: 48°58′51″N 14°37′0″E
- Country: Czech Republic
- Region: South Bohemian
- District: České Budějovice
- First mentioned: 1357

Area
  - Total: 9.64 km^{2} (3.72 sq mi)
- Elevation: 485 m (1,591 ft)

Population (2026-01-01)
  - Total: 267
  - Density: 27.7/km^{2} (71.7/sq mi)
- Time zone: UTC+1 (CET)
  - Summer (DST): UTC+2 (CEST)
- Postal code: 373 72
- Website: www.zvikovulisova.cz

Zvíkov is a municipality and village in České Budějovice District in the South Bohemian Region of the Czech Republic. It has about 300 inhabitants.

Zvíkov lies approximately 11 kilometres (7 mi) east of České Budějovice and 124 km (77 mi) south of Prague.

== Etymology ==
The name is derived either from the personal name Zviek, meaning "Zviek's", or from the Old Czech word zviek ('sound').

== Demographics ==
Historical population
Year	Pop.	±%
1869	316	—
1880	337	+6.6%
1890	331	−1.8%
1900	286	−13.6%
1910	326	+14.0%
1921	340	+4.3%
1930	314	−7.6%
1950	228	−27.4%
1961	242	+6.1%
1970	223	−7.9%
1980	205	−8.1%
1991	254	+23.9%
2001	266	+4.7%
2011	252	−5.3%
2021	258	+2.4%
Source: Censuses
