= Libín =

- Municipality
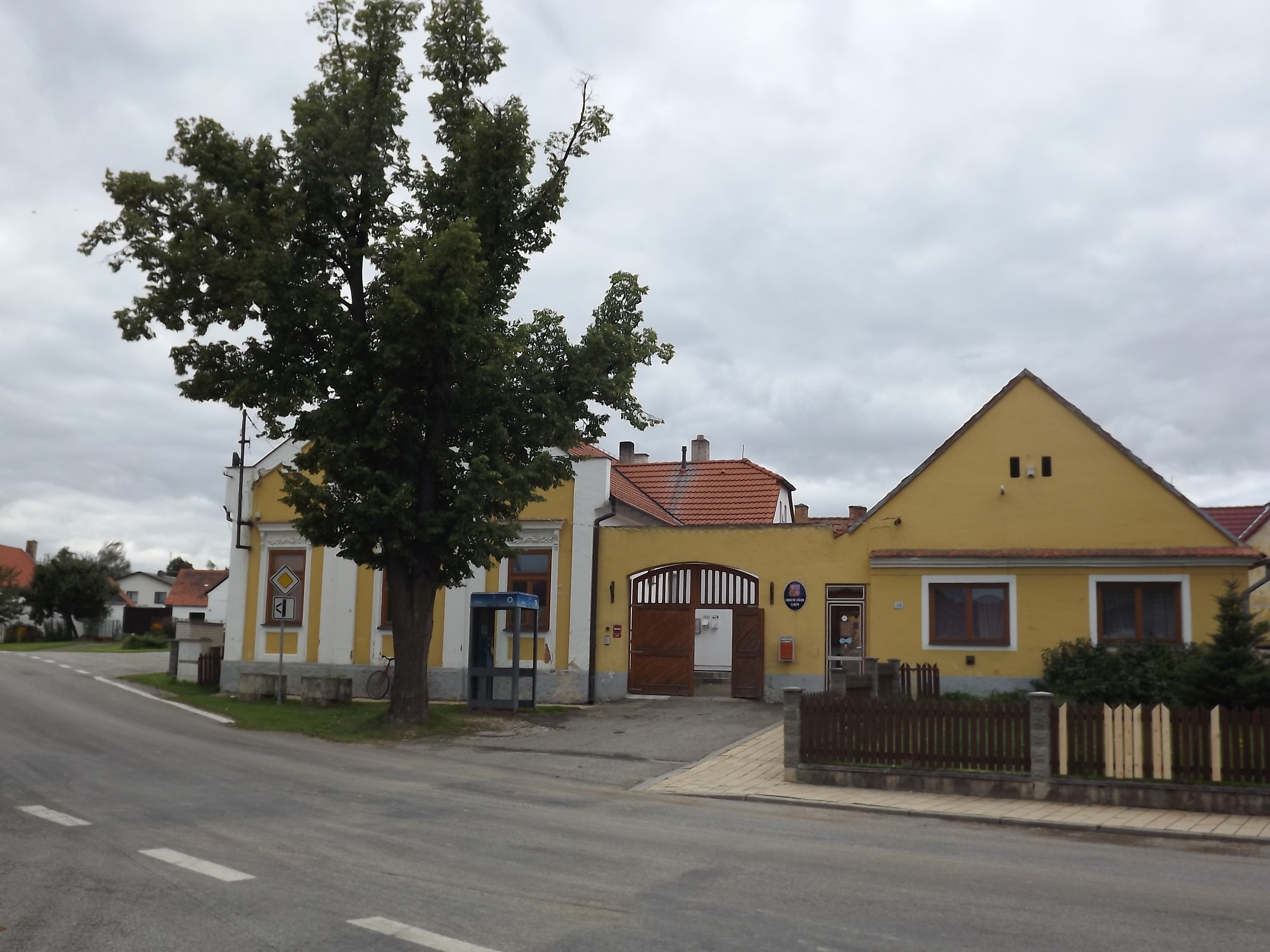
- Municipal office

- Location in the Czech Republic
- Coordinates: 48°58′11″N 14°41′1″E
- Country: Czech Republic
- Region: South Bohemian
- District: České Budějovice
- First mentioned: 1366

Area
  - Total: 21.19 km^{2} (8.18 sq mi)
- Elevation: 457 m (1,499 ft)

Population (2026-01-01)
  - Total: 431
  - Density: 20.3/km^{2} (52.7/sq mi)
- Time zone: UTC+1 (CET)
  - Summer (DST): UTC+2 (CEST)
- Postal code: 373 73
- Website: www.obeclibin.cz

Libín is a municipality and village in České Budějovice District in the South Bohemian Region of the Czech Republic. It has about 400 inhabitants.

Libín lies approximately 16 kilometres (10 mi) east of České Budějovice and 126 km (78 mi) south of Prague.

== Administrative division ==
Libín consists of three municipal parts (in brackets population according to the 2021 census):

- Libín (210)
- Slavošovice (83)
- Spolí (123)

== Demographics ==
Historical population
| Year | Pop. | ±% |
|---|---|---|
| 1869 | 637 | — |
| 1880 | 704 | +10.5% |
| 1890 | 627 | −10.9% |
| 1900 | 695 | +10.8% |
| 1910 | 675 | −2.9% |
| 1921 | 672 | −0.4% |
| 1930 | 599 | −10.9% |
| 1950 | 478 | −20.2% |
| 1961 | 441 | −7.7% |
| 1970 | 348 | −21.1% |
| 1980 | 292 | −16.1% |
| 1991 | 315 | +7.9% |
| 2001 | 307 | −2.5% |
| 2011 | 387 | +26.1% |
| 2021 | 416 | +7.5% |
Source: Censuses
