= Borek (České Budějovice District) =

- Municipality
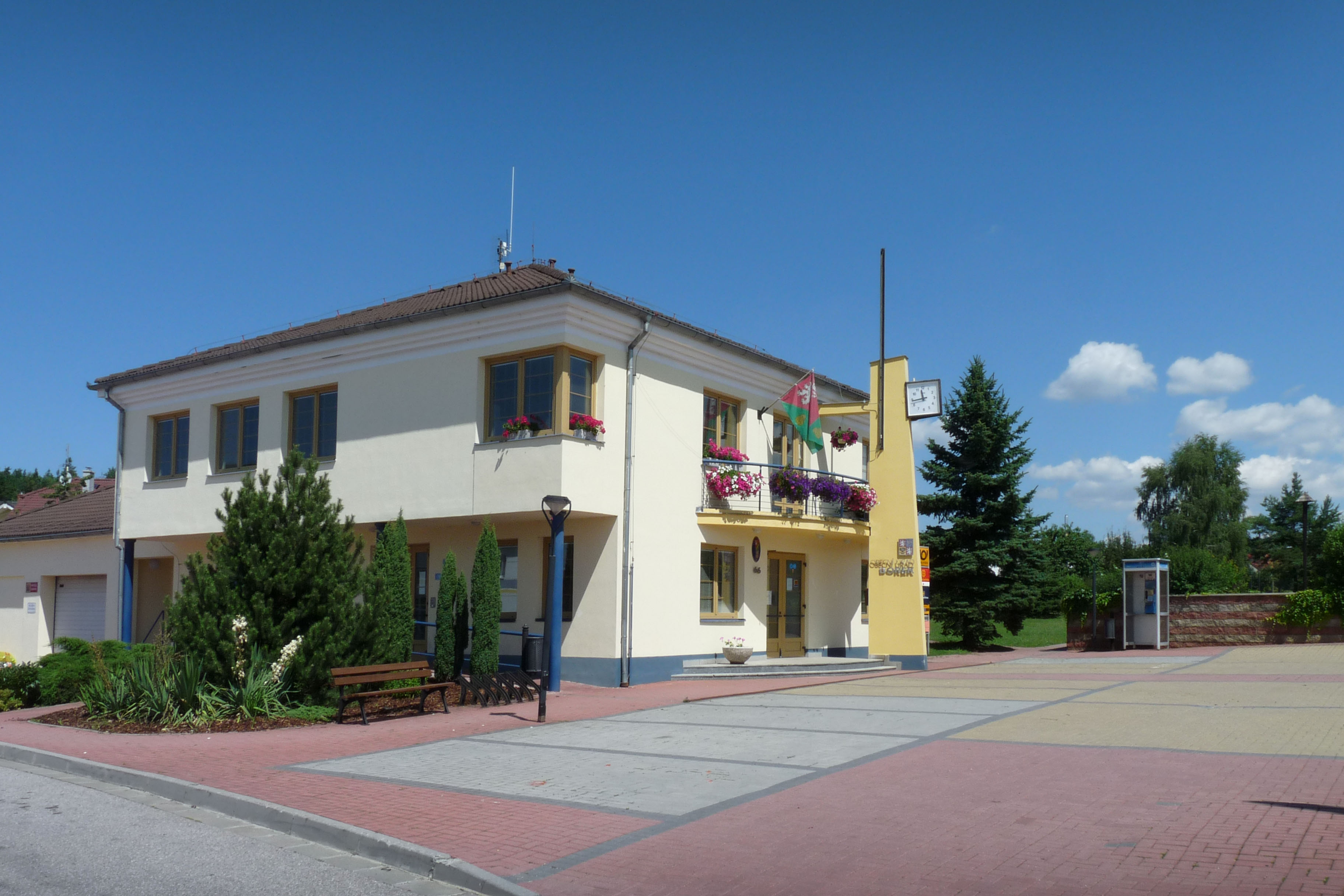
- Municipal office

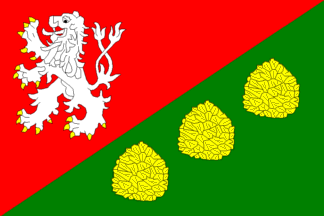
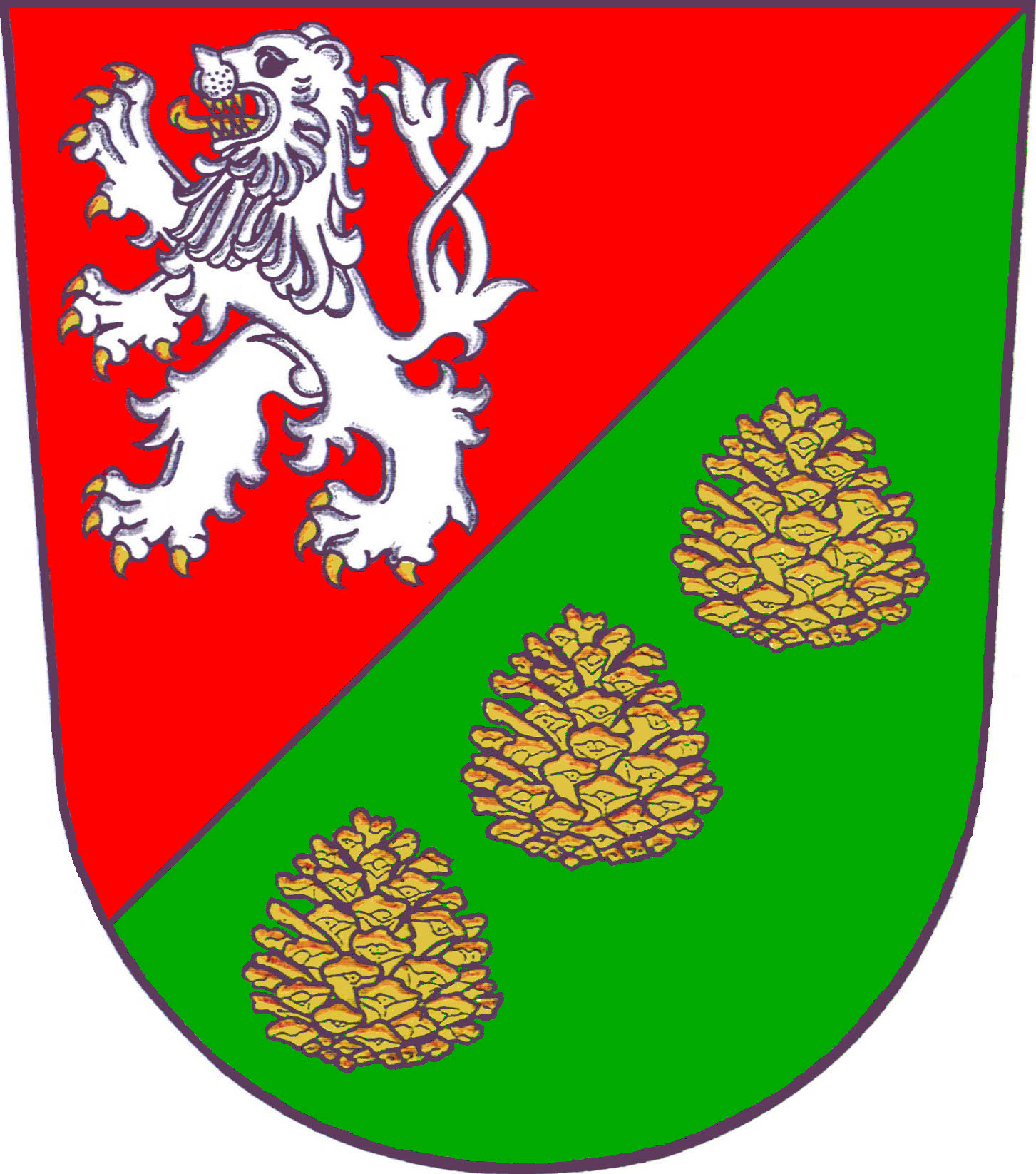
- Flag Coat of arms

- Location in the Czech Republic
- Coordinates: 49°1′24″N 14°30′3″E
- Country: Czech Republic
- Region: South Bohemian
- District: České Budějovice
- Founded: 1805

Area
  - Total: 1.97 km^{2} (0.76 sq mi)
- Elevation: 413 m (1,355 ft)

Population (2026-01-01)
  - Total: 1,583
  - Density: 804/km^{2} (2,080/sq mi)
- Time zone: UTC+1 (CET)
  - Summer (DST): UTC+2 (CEST)
- Postal code: 373 67
- Website: www.obecborek.eu

Borek is a municipality and village in České Budějovice District in the South Bohemian Region of the Czech Republic. It has about 1,600 inhabitants.

Borek lies approximately 6 kilometres (4 mi) north of České Budějovice and 119 km (74 mi) south of Prague.

== History ==
Borek was founded in 1805 and is one of the youngest villages in the region.

== Demographics ==
Historical population
Year	Pop.	±%
1869	68	—
1880	134	+97.1%
1890	186	+38.8%
1900	191	+2.7%
1910	159	−16.8%
1921	165	+3.8%
1930	290	+75.8%
1950	247	−14.8%
1961	325	+31.6%
1970	337	+3.7%
1980	852	+152.8%
1991	991	+16.3%
2001	1,133	+14.3%
2011	1,395	+23.1%
2021	1,521	+9.0%
Source: Censuses
