= Hůry =

- Municipality
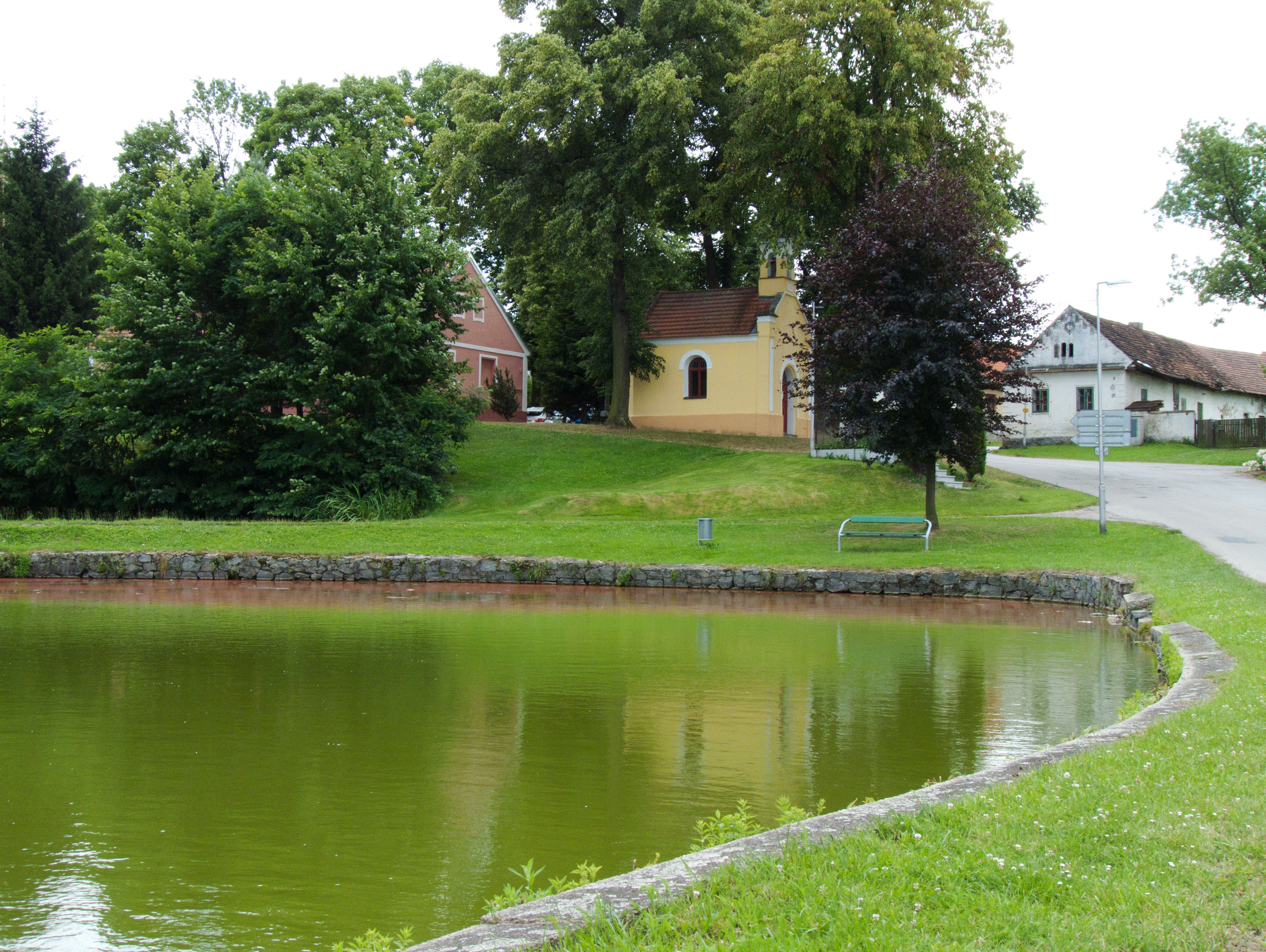
- Chapel of Saint Florian in the centre of Hůry

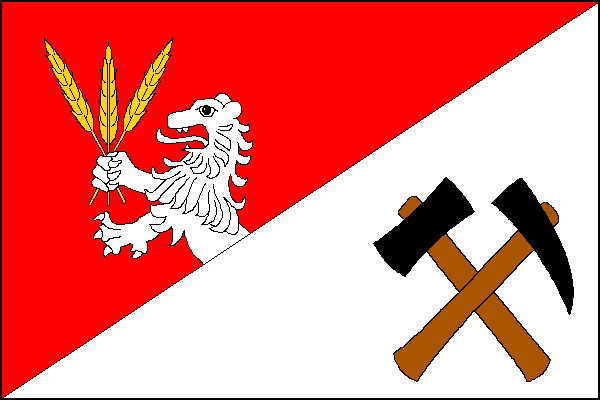
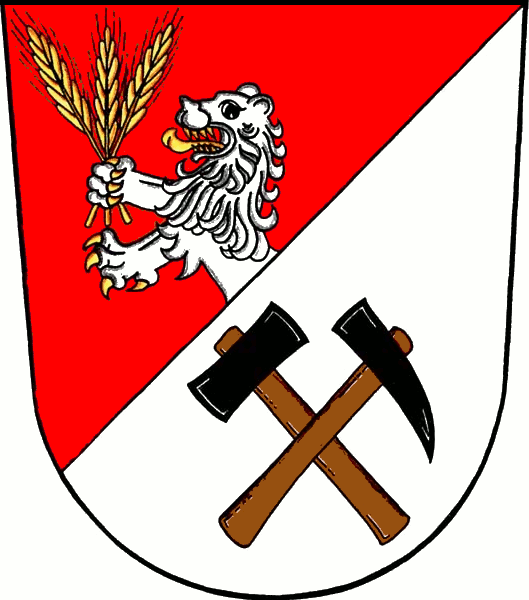
- Flag Coat of arms

- Location in the Czech Republic
- Coordinates: 49°0′24″N 14°32′28″E
- Country: Czech Republic
- Region: South Bohemian
- District: České Budějovice
- First mentioned: 1378

Area
  - Total: 5.34 km^{2} (2.06 sq mi)
- Elevation: 467 m (1,532 ft)

Population (2026-01-01)
  - Total: 607
  - Density: 114/km^{2} (294/sq mi)
- Time zone: UTC+1 (CET)
  - Summer (DST): UTC+2 (CEST)
- Postal code: 373 71
- Website: www.hury.cz

Hůry is a municipality and village in České Budějovice District in the South Bohemian Region of the Czech Republic. It has about 600 inhabitants.

Hůry lies approximately 6 kilometres (4 mi) north-east of České Budějovice and 121 km (75 mi) south of Prague.

== Demographics ==
Historical population
Year	Pop.	±%
1869	401	—
1880	418	+4.2%
1890	450	+7.7%
1900	476	+5.8%
1910	523	+9.9%
1921	489	−6.5%
1930	528	+8.0%
1950	332	−37.1%
1961	334	+0.6%
1970	312	−6.6%
1980	368	+17.9%
1991	388	+5.4%
2001	418	+7.7%
2011	559	+33.7%
2021	610	+9.1%
Source: Censuses
