= Mladošovice =

- Municipality
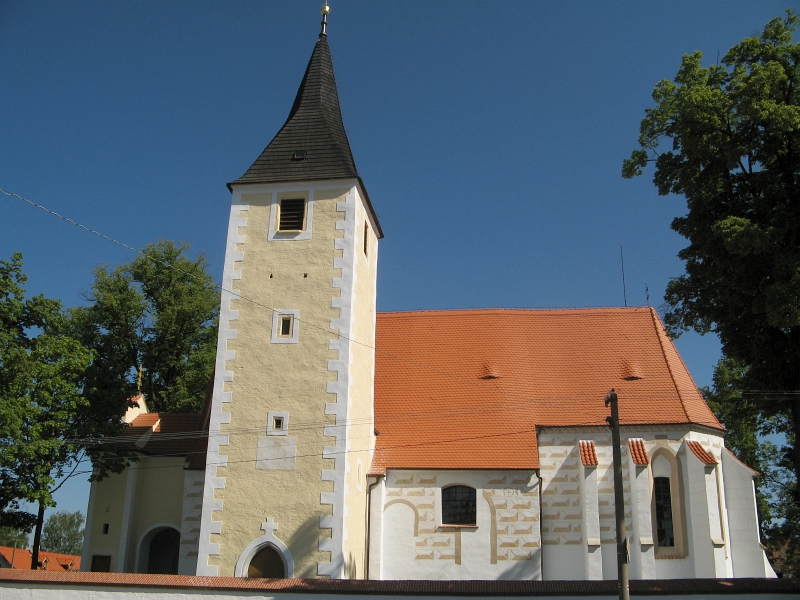
- Church of Saint Bartholomew

- Location in the Czech Republic
- Coordinates: 48°56′26″N 14°41′57″E
- Country: Czech Republic
- Region: South Bohemian
- District: České Budějovice
- First mentioned: 1367

Area
  - Total: 17.52 km^{2} (6.76 sq mi)
- Elevation: 476 m (1,562 ft)

Population (2026-01-01)
  - Total: 427
  - Density: 24.4/km^{2} (63.1/sq mi)
- Time zone: UTC+1 (CET)
  - Summer (DST): UTC+2 (CEST)
- Postal codes: 373 12, 379 01
- Website: www.obecmladosovice.cz

Mladošovice is a municipality and village in České Budějovice District in the South Bohemian Region of the Czech Republic. It has about 400 inhabitants.

Mladošovice lies approximately 17 kilometres (11 mi) east of České Budějovice and 129 km (80 mi) south of Prague.

== Administrative division ==
Mladošovice consists of three municipal parts (in brackets population according to the 2021 census):

- Mladošovice (233)
- Lhota (127)
- Petrovice (66)

== Demographics ==
Historical population
Year	Pop.	±%
1869	1,007	—
1880	972	−3.5%
1890	925	−4.8%
1900	912	−1.4%
1910	964	+5.7%
1921	883	−8.4%
1930	827	−6.3%
1950	602	−27.2%
1961	561	−6.8%
1970	445	−20.7%
1980	349	−21.6%
1991	309	−11.5%
2001	287	−7.1%
2011	365	+27.2%
2021	426	+16.7%
Source: Censuses
