= Borovnice (České Budějovice District) =

- Municipality
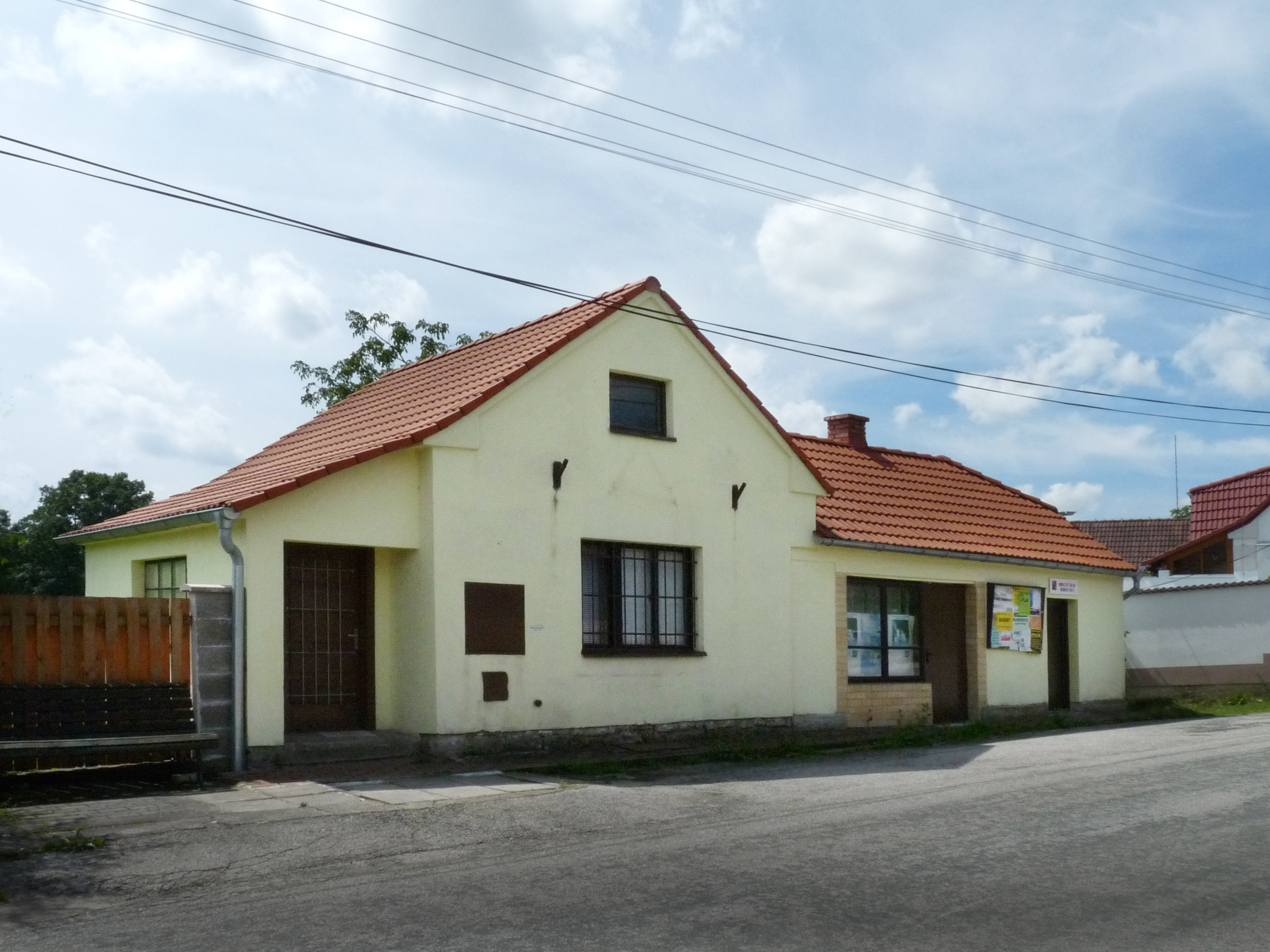
- Municipal office

- Location in the Czech Republic
- Coordinates: 48°54′44″N 14°31′8″E
- Country: Czech Republic
- Region: South Bohemian
- District: České Budějovice
- First mentioned: 1383

Area
  - Total: 2.74 km^{2} (1.06 sq mi)
- Elevation: 455 m (1,493 ft)

Population (2026-01-01)
  - Total: 156
  - Density: 56.9/km^{2} (147/sq mi)
- Time zone: UTC+1 (CET)
  - Summer (DST): UTC+2 (CEST)
- Postal code: 370 07
- Website: www.obecborovnice.cz

Borovnice (Czech pronunciation: [ˈborovɲɪtsɛ]; German: Borownitz) is a municipality and village in České Budějovice District in the South Bohemian Region of the Czech Republic. It has about 200 inhabitants.

Borovnice lies approximately 8 kilometres (5 mi) south-east of České Budějovice and 131 km (81 mi) south of Prague.

== Etymology ==
The name is derived from the Czech adjective borovná (which is derived from borovice, i.e. 'pine'). Borovnice was a common toponym for pine forests and streams flowing through pine forests, and from there it was transferred to settlements.

== Demographics ==
Historical population
Year	Pop.	±%
1869	118	—
1880	118	+0.0%
1890	118	+0.0%
1900	126	+6.8%
1910	144	+14.3%
1921	151	+4.9%
1930	124	−17.9%
1950	107	−13.7%
1961	139	+29.9%
1970	125	−10.1%
1980	88	−29.6%
1991	86	−2.3%
2001	92	+7.0%
2011	110	+19.6%
2021	150	+36.4%
Source: Censuses
