= Bezdrevský potok =

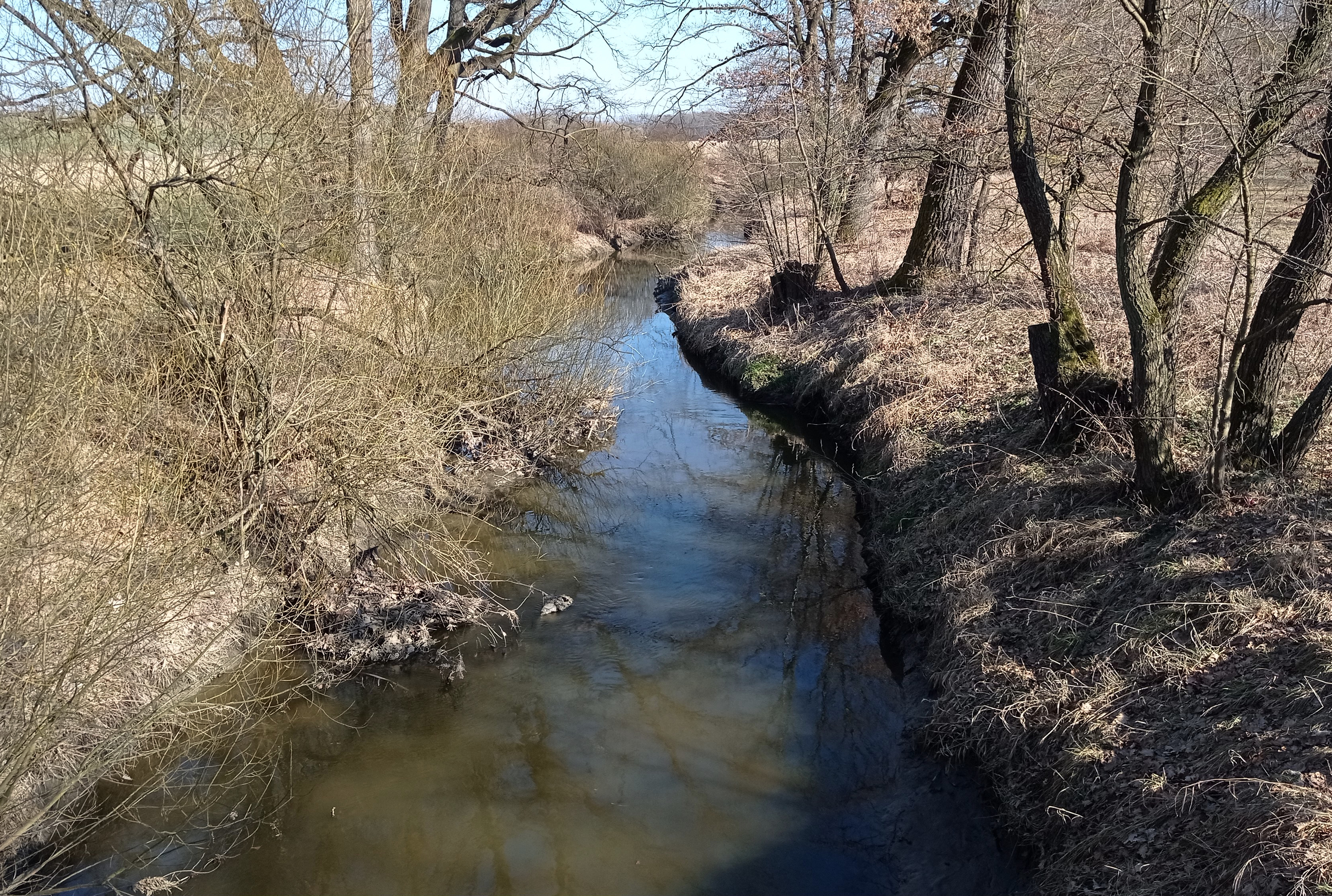
- The Bezdrevský potok near Sedlec

Location
- Country: Czech Republic
- Region: South Bohemian

Physical characteristics
- Source
  - location: Brloh, Bohemian Forest Foothills
  - coordinates: 48°56′25″N 14°10′53″E
  - elevation: 681 m (2,234 ft)
- Mouth
  - location: Vltava
  - coordinates: 49°1′55″N 14°26′32″E
  - elevation: 371 m (1,217 ft)
- Length: 43.1 km (26.8 mi)
- Basin size: 279.2 km^{2} (107.8 sq mi)
- Discharge
  - average: 1.28 m^{3}/s (45 cu ft/s) near estuary

Basin features
- Progression: Vltava→ Elbe→ North Sea

The Bezdrevský potok is a stream in the Czech Republic, a left tributary of the Vltava River. It flows through the South Bohemian Region. It is 43.1 km (26.8 mi) long.

== Etymology ==
The name means 'Bezdrev stream', referring to the Bezdrev fishpond. The name of the pond has its origin in the Czech words bez dřeva, meaning 'without woods'. It referred to a treeless plain on which the pond was established.

== Characteristic ==
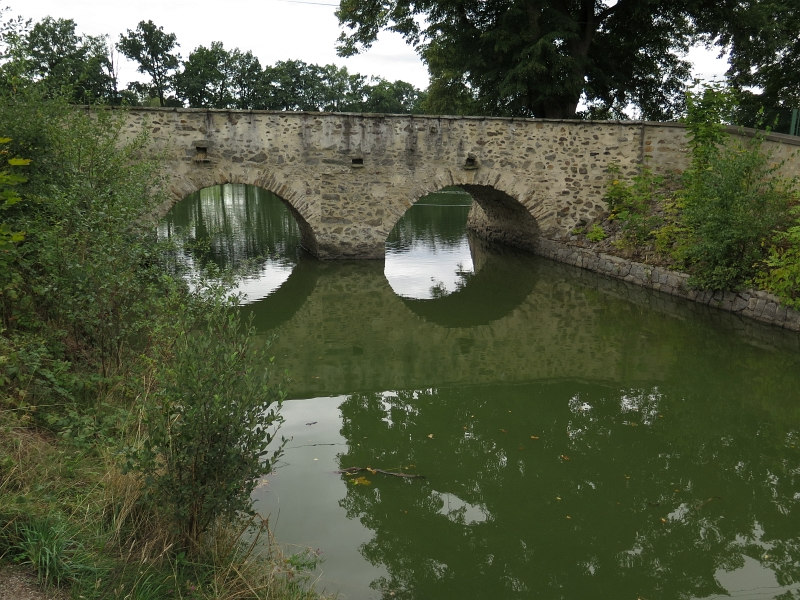
The Bezdrevský potok leaving the Mnich pond in Netolice

The Bezdrevský potok originates in the territory of Brloh in the Bohemian Forest Foothills at an elevation of 681 m (2,234 ft) and flows to Hluboká nad Vltavou, where it enters the Vltava River at an elevation of 371 m (1,217 ft). It is 43.1 km (26.8 mi) long. Its drainage basin has an area of 279.2 km^{2} (107.8 sq mi).

The longest tributaries of the Bezdrevský potok are:

Tributary	Length (km)	Side
Malovický potok	14.8	left
Melhutka	14.0	left
Olešník	12.6	left
Pištínský potok	12.4	right
Třebánka	9.1	left
Břehovský potok	9.0	right

== Course ==
The stream flows through the municipal territories of Brloh, Ktiš, Lhenice, Netolice, Malovice, Olšovice, Hlavatce, Sedlec, Dívčice, Mydlovary, Zliv and Hluboká nad Vltavou.

== Bodies of water ==
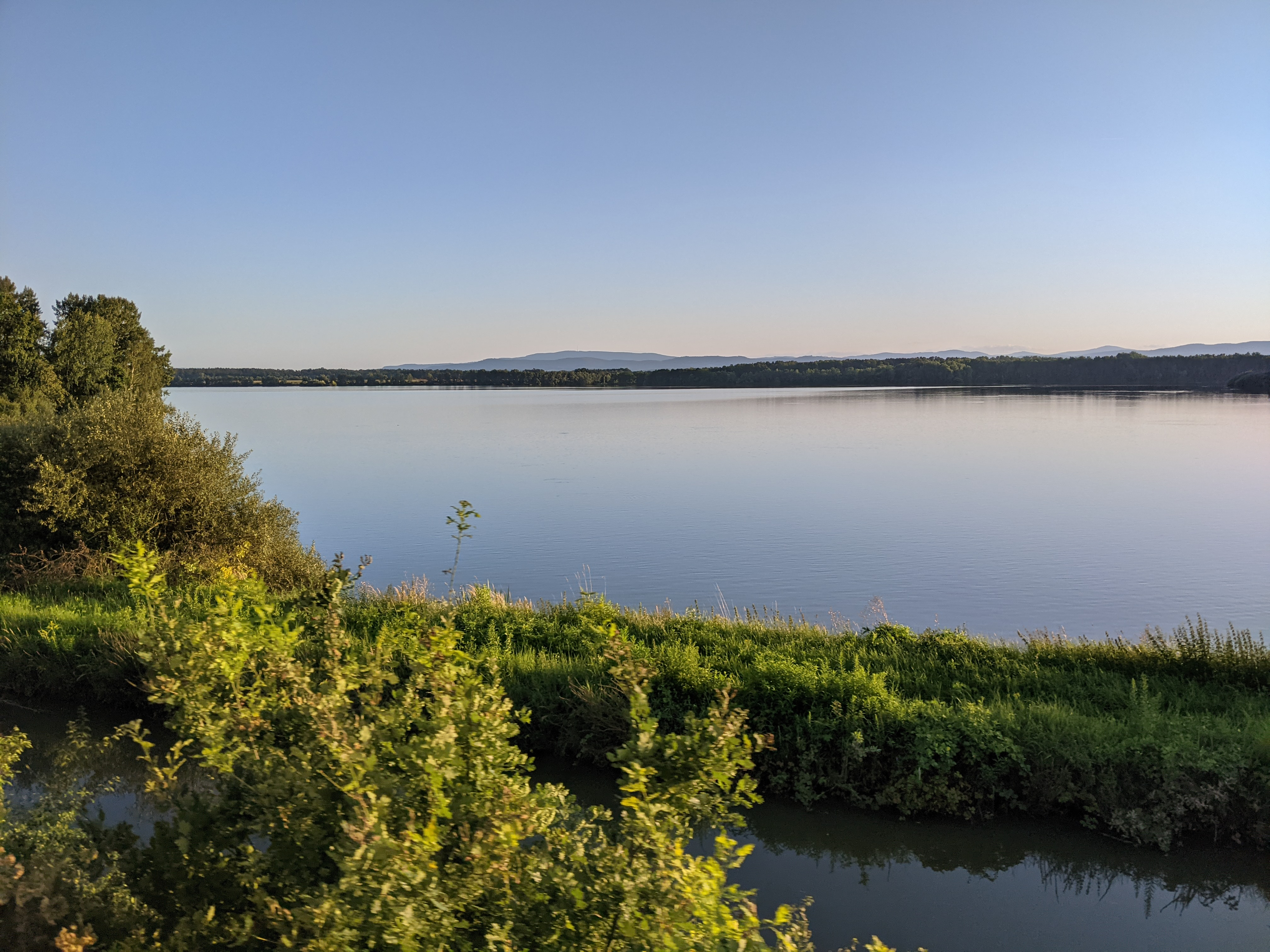
Northeastern part of Bezdrev pond

There are 456 bodies of water in the basin area. The basin area is rich in fishponds, especially the area of the lower course of the stream in the České Budějovice Basin. The largest of the fishponds and the third largest pond in the Czech Republic overall is Bezdrev with an area of 365 ha (900 acres), built directly on the Bezdrevský potok. Bezdrev was founded by Vilém II of Pernštejn before 1490. The Bezdrevský potok also supplies several other ponds.

== Bridges ==
In Netolice, near the dam of the Mnich pond, where the Bezdrevský potok leaves the pond, there are a pair of stone arched bridges, protected as a cultural monument. The older of the bridges probably dates from around 1746, which is the date of the statue that decorates it. The younger bridge was most likely built in the 19th century.

The dam of the Bezdrev pond and a bridge over the Bezdrevský potok next to the dam are together protected as a cultural monument. The stone three-arch bridge dates from 1879.

== See also ==
- List of rivers of the Czech Republic
