= Hlavatce =

Hlavatce may refer to places in the Czech Republic:

- Hlavatce (České Budějovice District), a municipality and village in the South Bohemian Region
- Hlavatce (Tábor District), a municipality and village in the South Bohemian Region
