= Dubné =

- Municipality
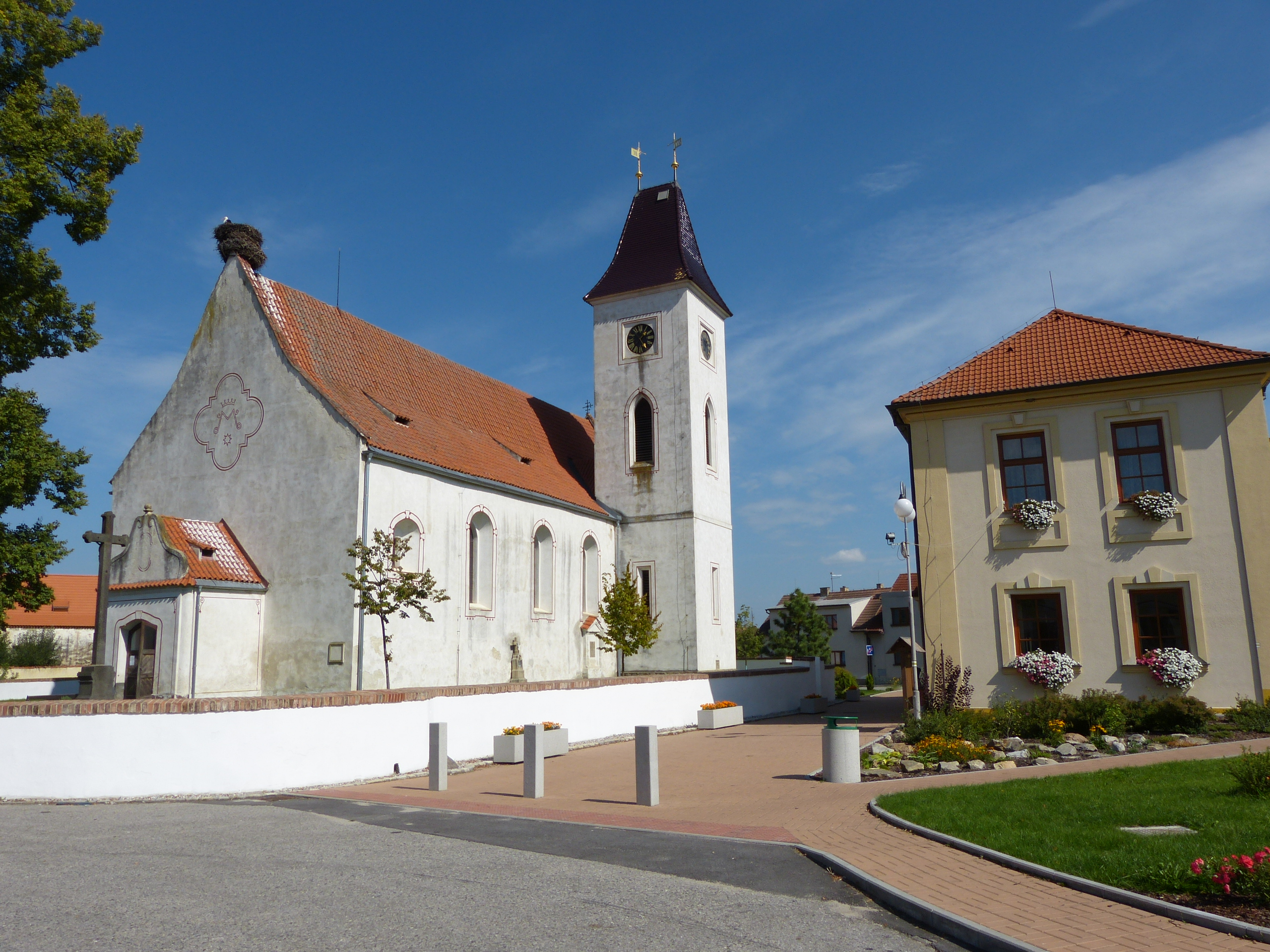
- Church of the Assumption of the Virgin Mary

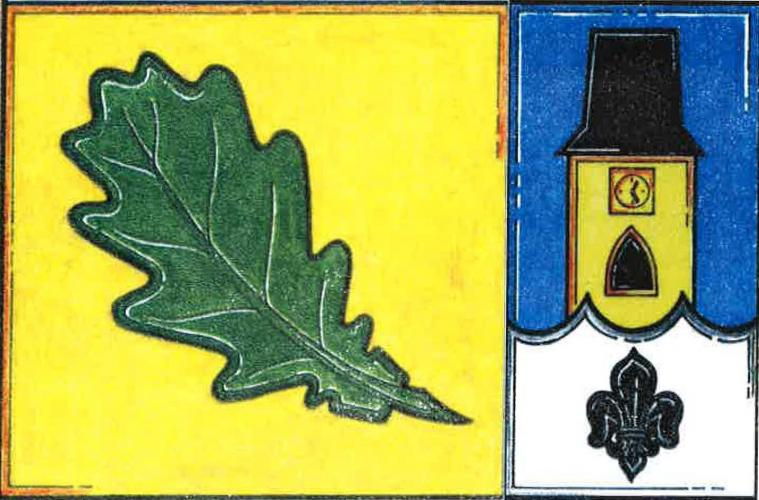
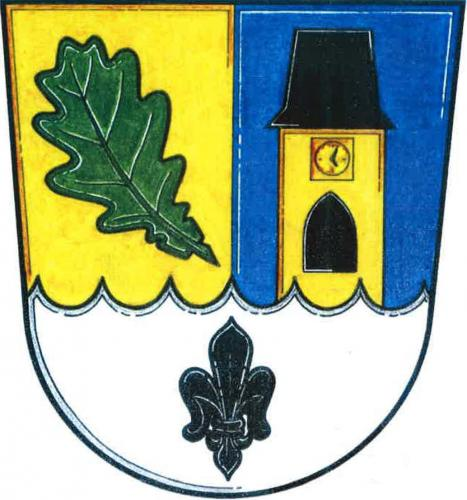
- Flag Coat of arms

- Location in the Czech Republic
- Coordinates: 48°58′35″N 14°21′37″E
- Country: Czech Republic
- Region: South Bohemian
- District: České Budějovice
- First mentioned: 1263

Area
  - Total: 16.77 km^{2} (6.47 sq mi)
- Elevation: 410 m (1,350 ft)

Population (2026-01-01)
  - Total: 1,763
  - Density: 105.1/km^{2} (272.3/sq mi)
- Time zone: UTC+1 (CET)
  - Summer (DST): UTC+2 (CEST)
- Postal code: 373 84
- Website: www.dubne.cz

Dubné is a municipality and village in České Budějovice District in the South Bohemian Region of the Czech Republic. It has about 1,800 inhabitants.

== Administrative division ==
Dubné consists of four municipal parts (in brackets population according to the 2021 census):

- Dubné (734)
- Jaronice (151)
- Křenovice (461)
- Třebín (335)

== Geography ==
Dubné is located about 7 kilometres (4 mi) west of České Budějovice. It lies in a flat landscape in the České Budějovice Basin. The municipal territory is rich in fishponds, typical for this region.

== History ==
The first written mention of Dubné is from 1263, when it is written about a lower nobleman Sudslav of Dubné. The village was held by a lesser nobility (Lords of Dubné, Roubík of Hlavatce, Dubenský of Chlum, Ojíř of Protivec) until the end of Bohemian Revolt. Then it was confiscated to Adam Chval Kunáš of Machovice. In 1623, the village was sold to the royal city of České Budějovice, which was the owner of Dubné until the abolition of serfdom in 1848.

Since 1850, Dubné has been an independent municipality. The other villages were joined in 1961, including Branišov, which became a separate municipality in 1994.

== Demographics ==
Historical population

| Year | Pop. | ±% |
|---|---|---|
| 1869 | 994 | — |
| 1880 | 1,085 | +9.2% |
| 1890 | 1,109 | +2.2% |
| 1900 | 1,102 | −0.6% |
| 1910 | 1,066 | −3.3% |

| Year | Pop. | ±% |
|---|---|---|
| 1921 | 1,020 | −4.3% |
| 1930 | 977 | −4.2% |
| 1950 | 878 | −10.1% |
| 1961 | 925 | +5.4% |
| 1970 | 889 | −3.9% |

| Year | Pop. | ±% |
|---|---|---|
| 1980 | 962 | +8.2% |
| 1991 | 1,024 | +6.4% |
| 2001 | 1,079 | +5.4% |
| 2011 | 1,381 | +28.0% |
| 2021 | 1,681 | +21.7% |

Source: Censuses

== Transport ==
There are no railways or major roads passing through the municipality.

== Sights ==
The main landmark of Dubné is the Church of the Assumption of the Virgin Mary. It is a Baroque church with a Gothic core from the 14th century. The tower was added in 1575 and replaced by a new one in 1901.
