= Sedlec (České Budějovice District) =

- Municipality
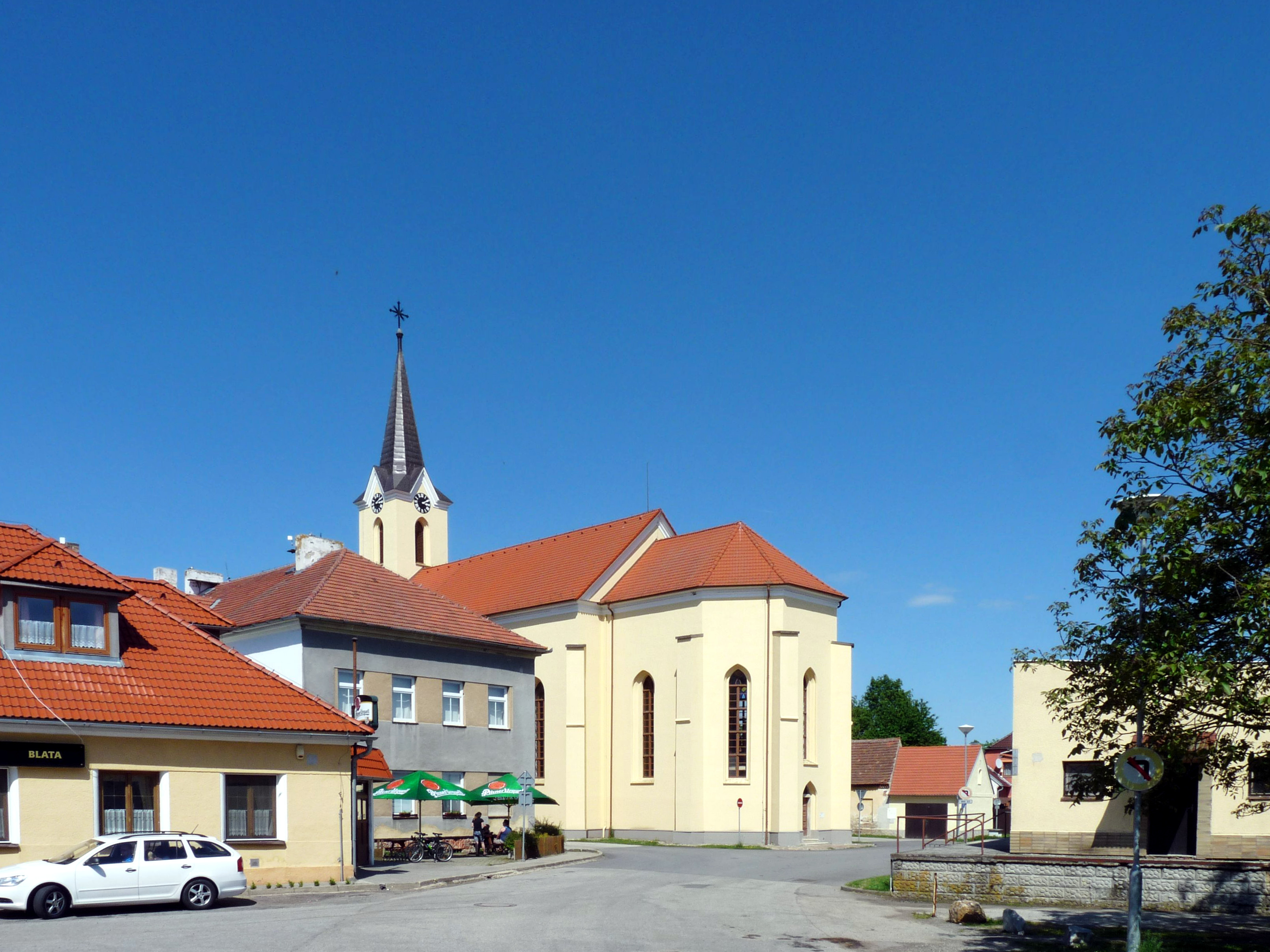
- Church of Saint John of Nepomuk

- Flag Coat of arms

- Location in the Czech Republic
- Coordinates: 49°4′22″N 14°17′11″E
- Country: Czech Republic
- Region: South Bohemian
- District: České Budějovice
- First mentioned: 1394

Area
  - Total: 20.26 km^{2} (7.82 sq mi)
- Elevation: 397 m (1,302 ft)

Population (2026-01-01)
  - Total: 530
  - Density: 26/km^{2} (68/sq mi)
- Time zone: UTC+1 (CET)
  - Summer (DST): UTC+2 (CEST)
- Postal code: 373 48
- Website: sedlec.eu

Sedlec is a municipality and village in České Budějovice District in the South Bohemian Region of the Czech Republic. It has about 500 inhabitants. The centres of the villages of Malé Chrášťany and Plástovice within the municipality are protected as two village monument reservations.

== Administrative division ==
Sedlec consists of five municipal parts (in brackets population according to the 2021 census):

- Sedlec (207)
- Lékařova Lhota (112)
- Malé Chrášťany (43)
- Plástovice (104)
- Vlhlavy (57)

== Etymology ==
The name is common in the Czech Republic. It is derived from the Czech word sedlo, which means 'saddle' in modern Czech, but also 'village' in old West Slavic languages.

== Geography ==
Sedlec is located about 18 kilometres (11 mi) northwest of České Budějovice. It lies in a flat landscape in the České Budějovice Basin. The stream Bezdrevský potok flows through the municipality.

There are several fishponds in the municipal territory; the largest of them are Volešek with an area of 134.4 hectares (332 acres) and Vlhlavský rybník with an area of 91.7 hectares (227 acres).

== History ==
The first written mention of Sedlec is from 1394. Until the 16th century, the village was owned by various lower noblemen. In the 1563, it was bought by William of Rosenberg and joined to the Libějovice estate. The local fortress ceased to serve as the seat of the nobility and was demolished in 1564. After the Battle of White Mountain in 1620, the estate was donated to Charles Bonaventure, Count of Bucquoy. Then the estate was acquired by the Schwarzenberg family, which owned Sedlec until the establishment of an independent municipality in 1848.

== Demographics ==
Historical population

Year	Pop.	±%
1869	957	—
1880	990	+3.4%
1890	924	−6.7%
1900	896	−3.0%
1910	913	+1.9%

Year	Pop.	±%
1921	878	−3.8%
1930	764	−13.0%
1950	575	−24.7%
1961	487	−15.3%
1970	482	−1.0%

Year	Pop.	±%
1980	377	−21.8%
1991	383	+1.6%
2001	446	+16.4%
2011	482	+8.1%
2021	523	+8.5%

Source: Censuses

== Transport ==
The I/20 road (part of the European route E49) from České Budějovice to Plzeň and Karlovy Vary runs through the municipality.

== Sights ==
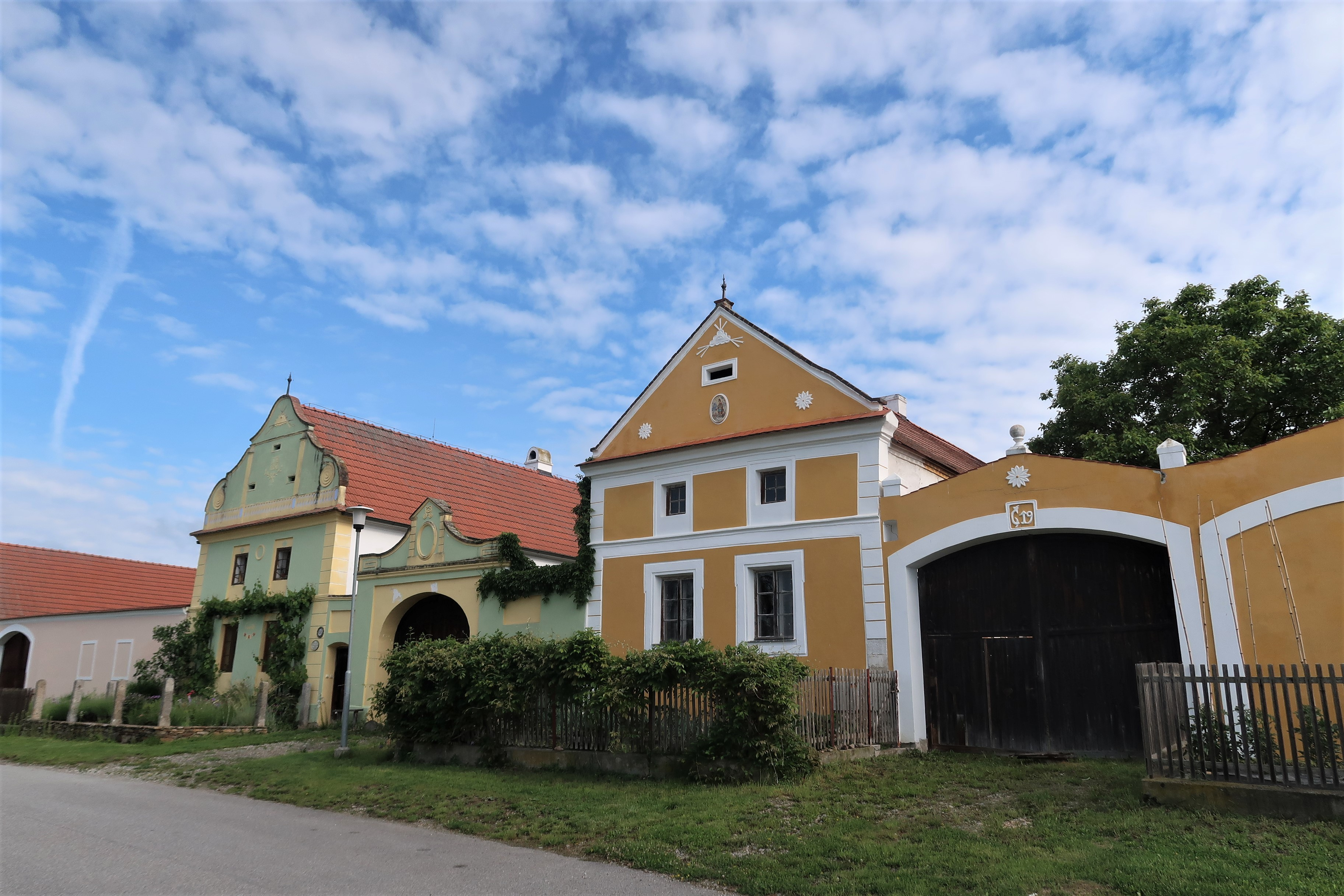
Centre of Plástovice

The main landmark of Sedlec is the Church of Saint John of Nepomuk. It was built in the neo-Gothic style and was finished in 1868. It replaced a small wooden church from the 18th century.

In Sedlec is a unique cemetery surrounded by a moat. It was founded on the site of a former fortress.

The centres of the villages of Malé Chrášťany and Plástovice are uniquely preserved sets of folk baroque buildings with a preserved layout. They are protected as two village monument reservations.

== Notable people ==
- Jan Veselý (1923–2003), cyclist
