= Skočice =

- Municipality
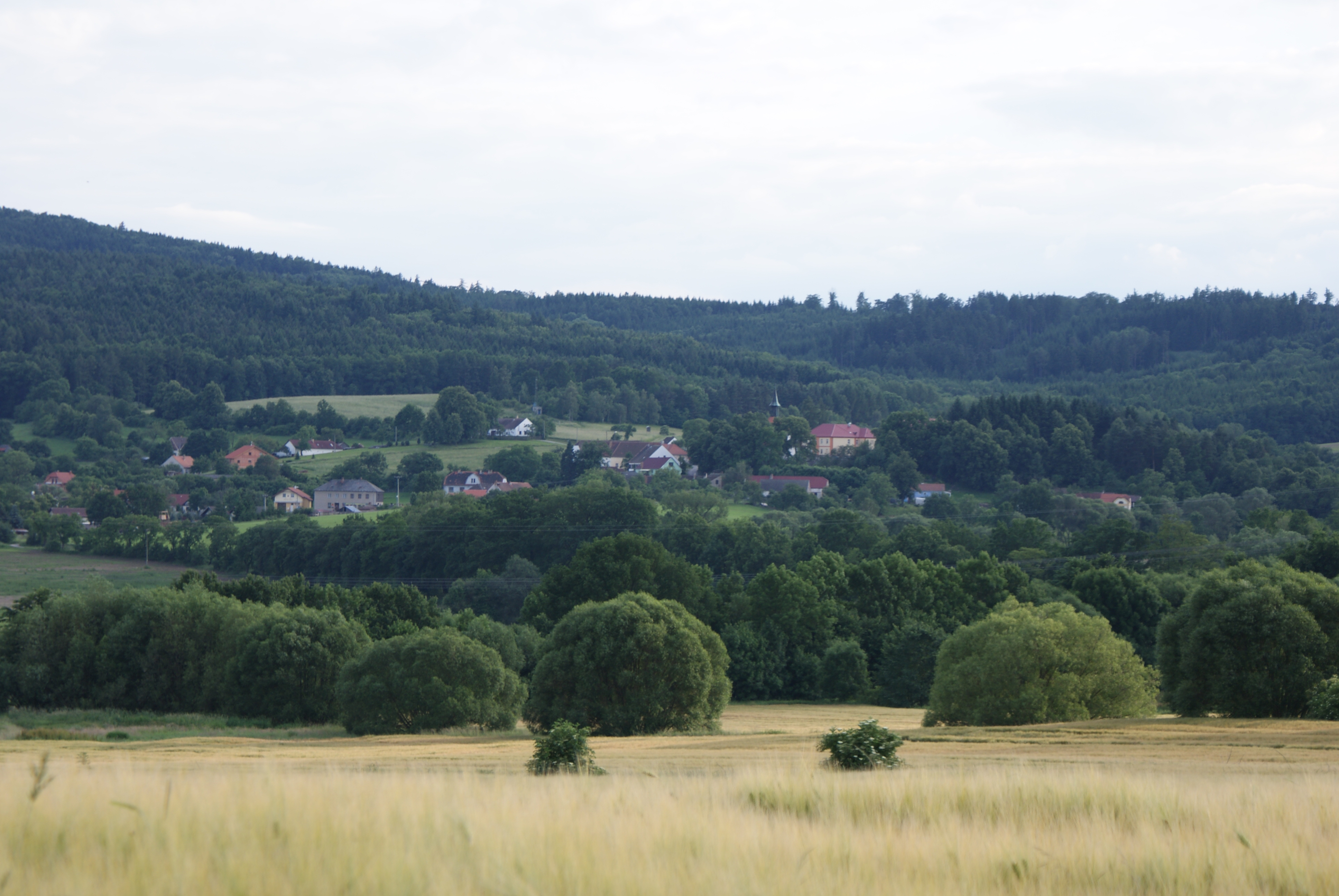
- View from the north

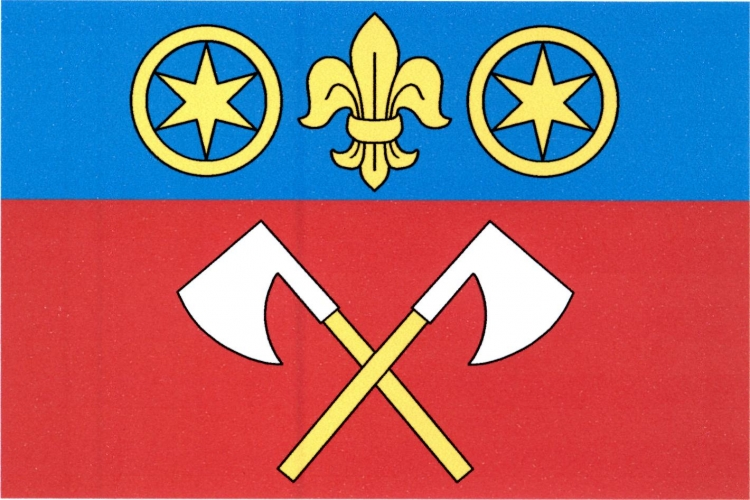
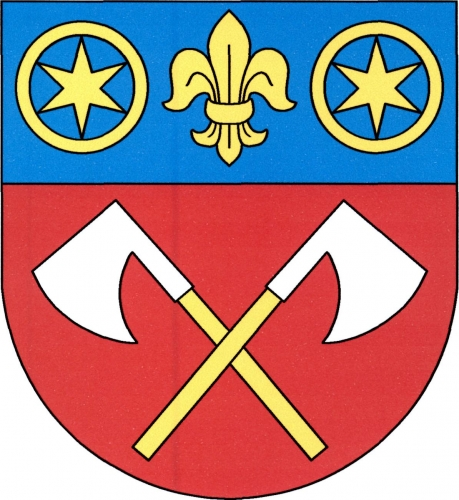
- Flag Coat of arms

- Location in the Czech Republic
- Coordinates: 49°11′10″N 14°6′15″E
- Country: Czech Republic
- Region: South Bohemian
- District: Strakonice
- First mentioned: 1399

Area
  - Total: 9.82 km^{2} (3.79 sq mi)
- Elevation: 462 m (1,516 ft)

Population (2026-01-01)
  - Total: 243
  - Density: 24.7/km^{2} (64.1/sq mi)
- Time zone: UTC+1 (CET)
  - Summer (DST): UTC+2 (CEST)
- Postal codes: 387 75, 389 01
- Website: www.skocice.cz

Skočice is a municipality and village in Strakonice District in the South Bohemian Region of the Czech Republic. It has about 200 inhabitants.

== Administrative division ==
Skočice consists of two municipal parts (in brackets population according to the 2021 census):

- Skočice (143)
- Lidmovice (72)

== Etymology ==
The name is derived from the personal name Skok, meaning "the village of Skok's people".

== Geography ==
Skočice is located about 16 kilometres (10 mi) southeast of Strakonice and 34 km (21 mi) northwest of České Budějovice. The western part of the municipality with the Skočice village lies in the Bohemian Forest Foothills and the eastern part with Lidmovice lies in the České Budějovice Basin. The highest point is the hill Hrad at 667 m (2,188 ft) above sea level, located on the eastern border of the municipality. The slopes of the hill are protected as the Skočický Hrad Nature Reserve.

The brook Lidmovický potok originates here and flows across the municipal territory. There are several fishponds in the municipality, the largest of which are Jordán and Louženský rybník.

== History ==
The first written mention of Skočice is from 1399.

== Demographics ==
Historical population

Year	Pop.	±%
1869	507	—
1880	510	+0.6%
1890	485	−4.9%
1900	432	−10.9%
1910	469	+8.6%

Year	Pop.	±%
1921	442	−5.8%
1930	428	−3.2%
1950	275	−35.7%
1961	268	−2.5%
1970	242	−9.7%

Year	Pop.	±%
1980	212	−12.4%
1991	191	−9.9%
2001	195	+2.1%
2011	204	+4.6%
2021	215	+5.4%

Source: Censuses

== Transport ==
The I/22 road from Vodňany to Strakonice, which further continues to Klatovy, runs through the municipality.

== Sights ==
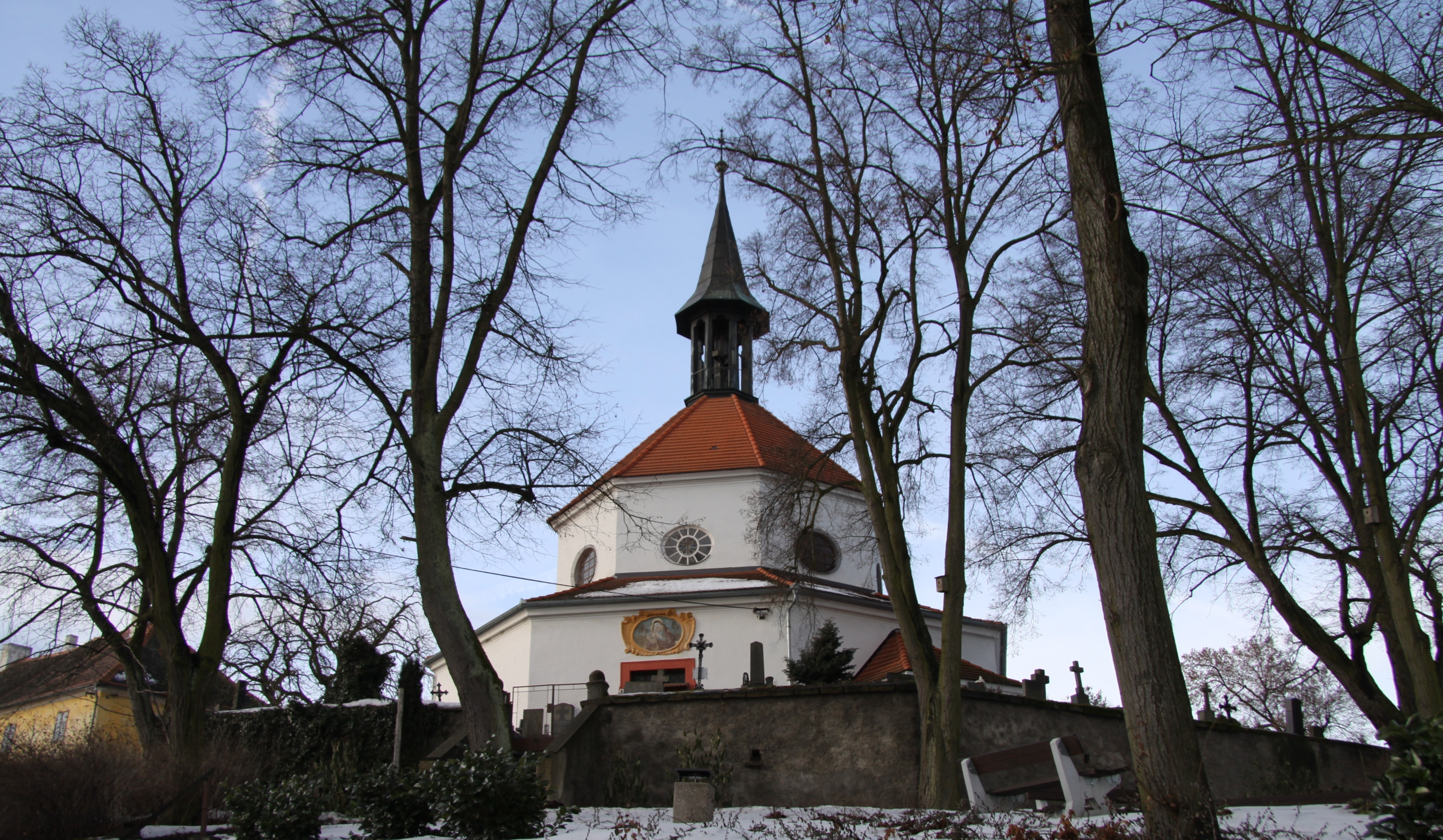
Church of the Visitation of Our Lady

The main landmark of Skočice is the Church of the Visitation of Our Lady. It is an atypical octagonal church, built is the early Baroque style in 1677–1678. The church, originally as a chapel, was built for Polyxena Ludmila of Sternberg for its alleged miraculous image of Our Lady of Help (a copy of Cranach's Icon of Maria Hilf in Passau), and subsequently became a pilgrimage site. The area includes the cemetery and the Chapel of Saint John of Nepomuk from the mid-18th century.
