= Brloh (Český Krumlov District) =

- Municipality
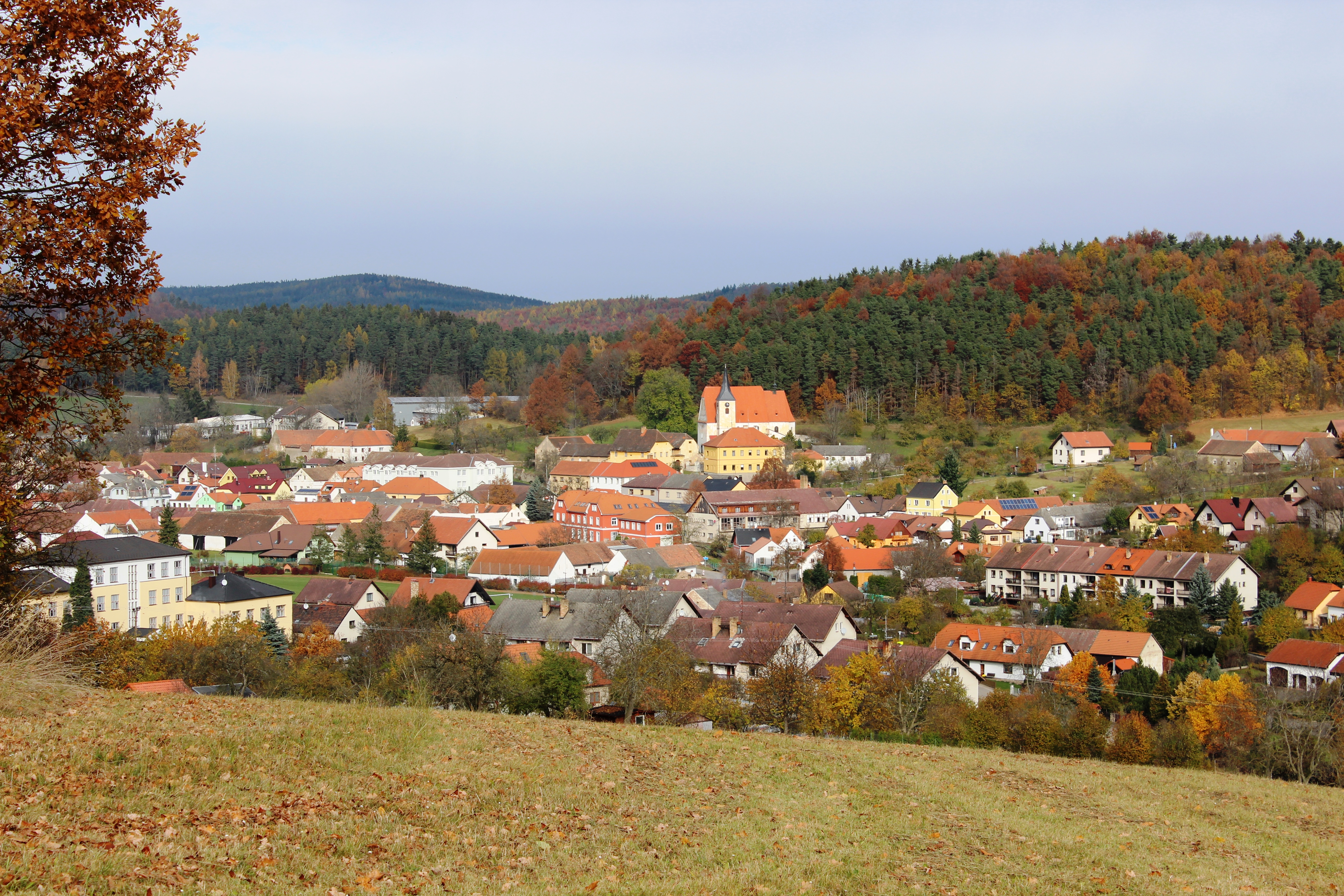
- View from the south

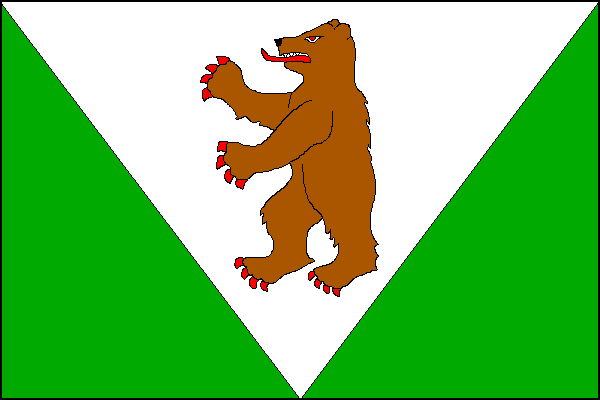
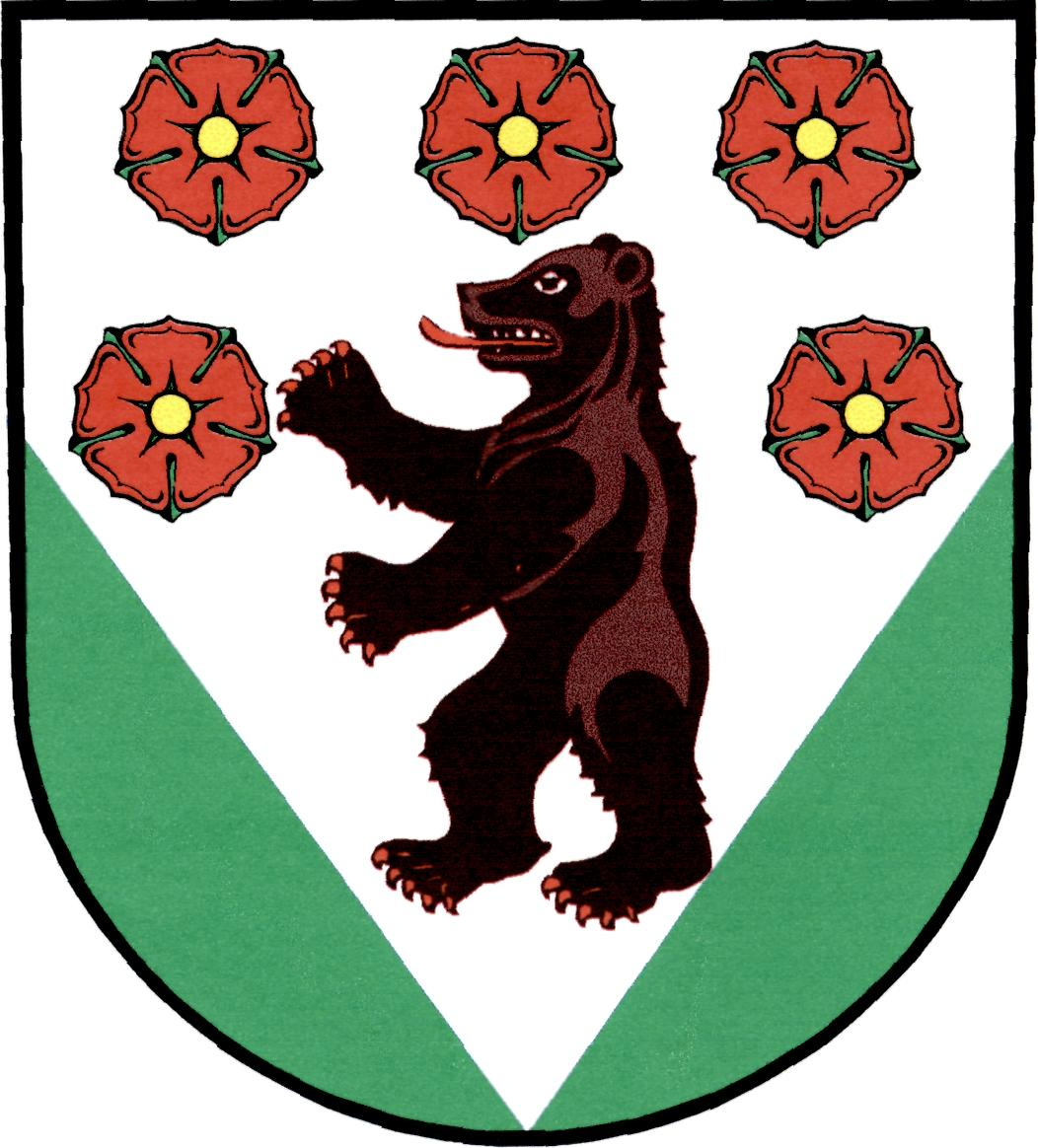
- Flag Coat of arms

- Location in the Czech Republic
- Coordinates: 48°55′48″N 14°13′7″E
- Country: Czech Republic
- Region: South Bohemian
- District: Český Krumlov
- First mentioned: 1310

Area
  - Total: 46.17 km^{2} (17.83 sq mi)
- Elevation: 568 m (1,864 ft)

Population (2026-01-01)
  - Total: 1,044
  - Density: 22.61/km^{2} (58.57/sq mi)
- Time zone: UTC+1 (CET)
  - Summer (DST): UTC+2 (CEST)
- Postal codes: 382 03, 382 06
- Website: www.obecbrloh.cz

Brloh (German: Berlau) is a municipality and village in Český Krumlov District in the South Bohemian Region of the Czech Republic. It has about 1,000 inhabitants.

Brloh lies approximately 15 kilometres (9 mi) north-west of Český Krumlov, 20 km (12 mi) west of České Budějovice, and 130 km (81 mi) south of Prague. The stream Bezdrevský potok originates in the municipal territory.

== Administrative division ==
Brloh consists of seven municipal parts (in brackets population according to the 2021 census):

- Brloh (819)
- Janské Údolí (62)
- Jaronín (76)
- Kovářov (2)
- Rojšín (79)
- Rychtářov (10)
- Sedm Chalup (26)

== Demographics ==
Historical population
Year	Pop.	±%
1869	2,086	—
1880	2,242	+7.5%
1890	2,056	−8.3%
1900	2,020	−1.8%
1910	2,066	+2.3%
1921	1,983	−4.0%
1930	1,996	+0.7%
1950	1,297	−35.0%
1961	1,188	−8.4%
1970	1,057	−11.0%
1980	928	−12.2%
1991	960	+3.4%
2001	1,036	+7.9%
2011	1,036	+0.0%
2021	1,074	+3.7%
Source: Censuses
