= Zliv =

- Town
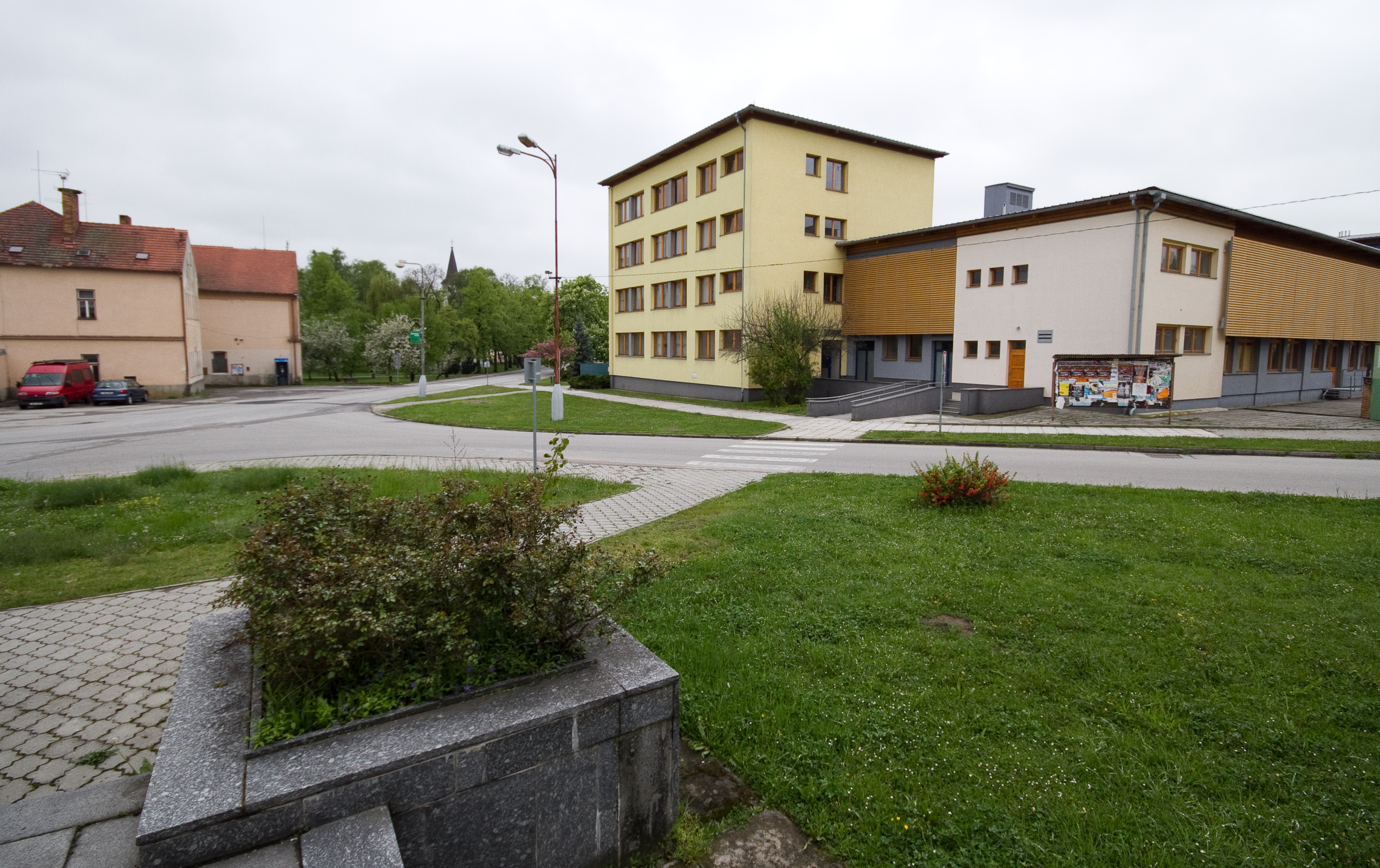
- Town hall

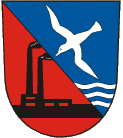
- Coat of arms

- Location in the Czech Republic
- Coordinates: 49°3′58″N 14°21′58″E
- Country: Czech Republic
- Region: South Bohemian
- District: České Budějovice
- First mentioned: 1409

Government
  - Mayor: Radek Rothschedl

Area
  - Total: 14.21 km^{2} (5.49 sq mi)
- Elevation: 375 m (1,230 ft)

Population (2026-01-01)
  - Total: 3,426
  - Density: 241.1/km^{2} (624.4/sq mi)
- Time zone: UTC+1 (CET)
  - Summer (DST): UTC+2 (CEST)
- Postal code: 373 44
- Website: www.zliv.cz

Zliv (Czech pronunciation: [ˈzlɪf]; German: Sliw) is a town in České Budějovice District in the South Bohemian Region of the Czech Republic. It has about 3,400 inhabitants. The town is located on the stream Bezdrevský potok in the České Budějovice Basin and is surrounded with fishponds.

== Etymology ==
The name is derived from the personal name Zliv.

== Geography ==
Zliv is located about 12 kilometres (7 mi) northwest of České Budějovice. It lies in a flat landscape in the České Budějovice Basin. The town is situated on the banks of the stream Bezdrevský potok and on the shores of several fishponds, including Bezdrev, which is the third largest pond in the country with an area of 365 ha (900 acres).

== History ==
The first written mention of Zliv is from 1409, when it was a serfdom village of the Hluboká estate. By the end of the 19th century, the economic expansion of the village occurred and factories for production of ceramics and grog were founded.

Zliv was promoted to a town in 1960.

== Demographics ==
Historical population

Year	Pop.	±%
1869	292	—
1880	454	+55.5%
1890	614	+35.2%
1900	1,021	+66.3%
1910	1,150	+12.6%

Year	Pop.	±%
1921	1,370	+19.1%
1930	1,499	+9.4%
1950	1,368	−8.7%
1961	2,125	+55.3%
1970	2,787	+31.2%

Year	Pop.	±%
1980	3,547	+27.3%
1991	3,770	+6.3%
2001	3,699	−1.9%
2011	3,489	−5.7%
2021	3,410	−2.3%

Source: Censuses

== Transport ==
Zliv is located on the railway lines heading from České Budějovice to Prague and to Strakonice.

== Sights ==
The only protected cultural monument in the town is a Baroque stone double-arched bridge, which dates from 1724. It is decorated with a statue of Saint John of Nepomuk.

A notable landmark is the Church of Saint Wenceslaus. It is a modern neo-Gothic church from 1913. It was built on the site of a chapel from 1865.
