= Ktiš =

- Municipality
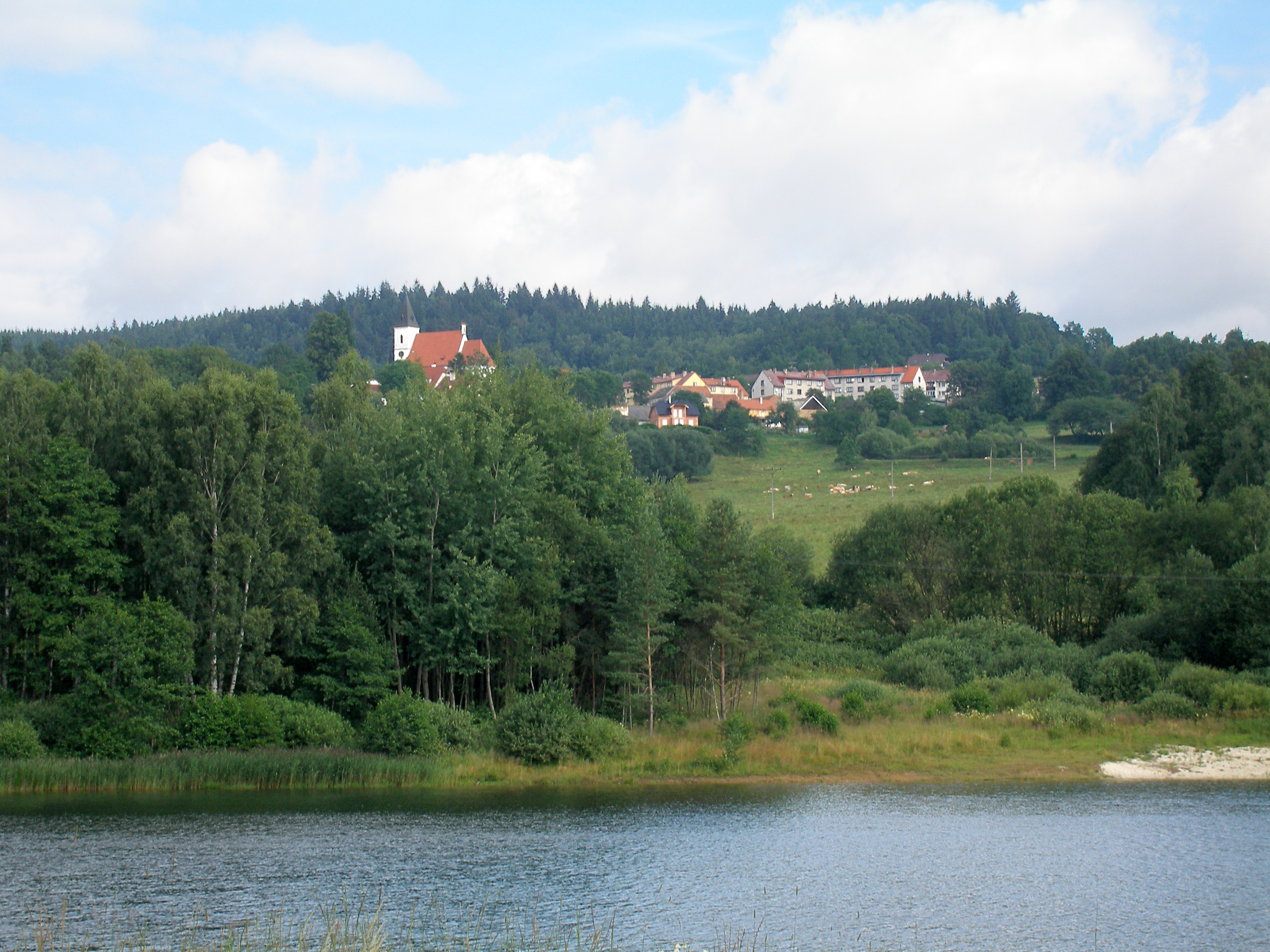
- View from the south

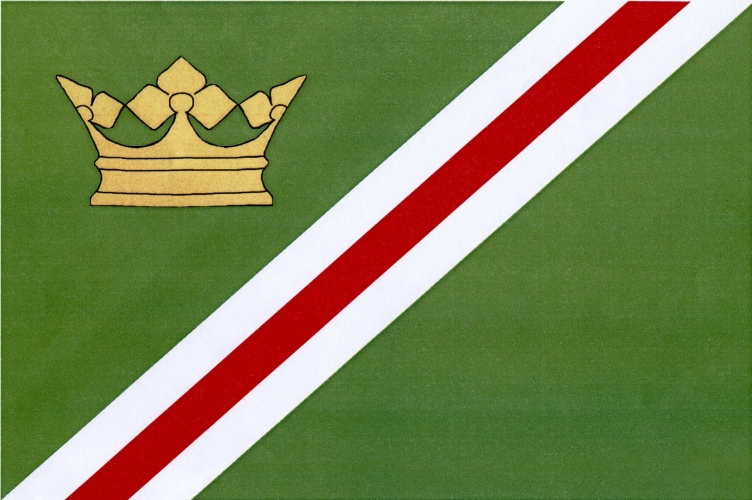
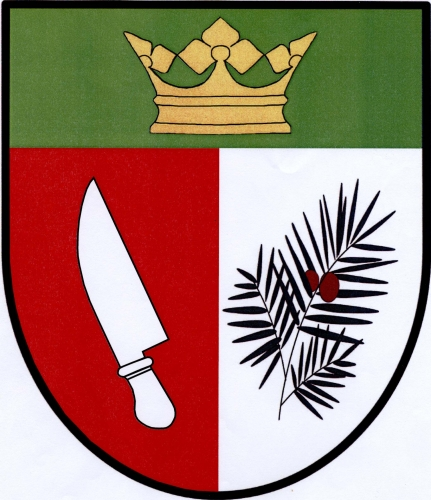
- Flag Coat of arms

- Location in the Czech Republic
- Coordinates: 48°55′1″N 14°7′58″E
- Country: Czech Republic
- Region: South Bohemian
- District: Prachatice
- First mentioned: 1310

Area
  - Total: 38.79 km^{2} (14.98 sq mi)
- Elevation: 762 m (2,500 ft)

Population (2026-01-01)
  - Total: 477
  - Density: 12.3/km^{2} (31.8/sq mi)
- Time zone: UTC+1 (CET)
  - Summer (DST): UTC+2 (CEST)
- Postal codes: 383 01, 384 03, 384 04
- Website: www.ktis.cz

Ktiš (German: Tisch) is a municipality and village in Prachatice District in the South Bohemian Region of the Czech Republic. It has about 500 inhabitants.

== Administrative division ==
Ktiš consists of nine municipal parts (in brackets population according to the 2021 census):

- Ktiš (309)
- Březovík (48)
- Dobročkov (3)
- Ktiš-Pila (9)
- Miletínky (15)
- Smědeč (35)
- Smědeček (18)
- Tisovka (28)
- Třebovice (6)

== Etymology ==
The origin of the name is uncertain. The initial name of the village was probably Choťúš, meaning "Choťouch's (court)", and the name Ktiš evolved from Choťúš.

== Geography ==
Ktiš is located about 14 kilometres (9 mi) southeast of Prachatice and 25 km (16 mi) west of České Budějovice. It lies mostly in the Bohemian Forest Foothills, only the westernmost part of the municipality extends into the Bohemian Forest mountain range. The highest point is the mountain Ktišská hora at 911 m (2,989 ft) above sea level.

The stream Křemžský potok flows through the municipality. The upper course of the stream Bezdrevský potok crosses the municipality in the north. The territory of Ktiš is rich in small streams and fishponds. In the east, the municipality extends into the Blanský les Protected Landscape Area.

=== Climate ===
Ktiš's climate is classified as humid continental climate (Köppen: Dfb; Trewartha: Dclo). Among them, the annual average temperature is 7.4 °C (45.3 °F), the hottest month in July is 16.8 °C (62.2 °F), and the coldest month is −1.5 °C (29.3 °F) in January. The annual precipitation is 804.6 millimetres (31.68 in), of which June is the wettest with 111.5 millimetres (4.39 in), while December is the driest with only 42.6 millimetres (1.68 in). The extreme temperature throughout the year ranged from −23.4 °C (−10.1 °F) on 3 February 2012 to 33.8 °C (92.8 °F) on 7 August 2015.

Climate data for Ktiš-Tisovka, 1991–2020 normals, extremes 1994–present
Month	Jan	Feb	Mar	Apr	May	Jun	Jul	Aug	Sep	Oct	Nov	Dec	Year
Record high °C (°F)	16.9 (62.4)	19.0 (66.2)	22.6 (72.7)	27.8 (82.0)	28.7 (83.7)	32.2 (90.0)	33.1 (91.6)	33.8 (92.8)	30.8 (87.4)	24.9 (76.8)	19.8 (67.6)	15.3 (59.5)	33.8 (92.8)
Mean daily maximum °C (°F)	1.8 (35.2)	2.8 (37.0)	7.8 (46.0)	13.4 (56.1)	16.7 (62.1)	21.4 (70.5)	23.4 (74.1)	23.3 (73.9)	17.8 (64.0)	12.9 (55.2)	6.8 (44.2)	3.8 (38.8)	12.7 (54.9)
Daily mean °C (°F)	−1.5 (29.3)	−1.2 (29.8)	2.3 (36.1)	7.0 (44.6)	10.7 (51.3)	15.2 (59.4)	16.8 (62.2)	16.3 (61.3)	11.7 (53.1)	7.5 (45.5)	3.0 (37.4)	0.5 (32.9)	7.4 (45.3)
Mean daily minimum °C (°F)	−4.5 (23.9)	−4.5 (23.9)	−1.6 (29.1)	1.7 (35.1)	5.7 (42.3)	9.8 (49.6)	11.4 (52.5)	10.9 (51.6)	7.3 (45.1)	3.5 (38.3)	−0.2 (31.6)	−2.8 (27.0)	3.1 (37.6)
Record low °C (°F)	−18.2 (−0.8)	−23.4 (−10.1)	−19.4 (−2.9)	−9.3 (15.3)	−3.3 (26.1)	−0.7 (30.7)	2.8 (37.0)	2.6 (36.7)	−3.1 (26.4)	−5.3 (22.5)	−11.9 (10.6)	−14.5 (5.9)	−23.4 (−10.1)
Average precipitation mm (inches)	48.7 (1.92)	44.5 (1.75)	55.5 (2.19)	47.7 (1.88)	85.5 (3.37)	111.5 (4.39)	107.1 (4.22)	103.7 (4.08)	59.1 (2.33)	55.0 (2.17)	43.8 (1.72)	42.6 (1.68)	804.6 (31.68)
Average snowfall cm (inches)	36.2 (14.3)	31.8 (12.5)	25.2 (9.9)	8.0 (3.1)	0 (0)	0 (0)	0 (0)	0 (0)	0 (0)	2.6 (1.0)	14.9 (5.9)	25.9 (10.2)	144.6 (56.9)
Average relative humidity (%)	85.3	80.2	76.4	72.0	76.9	75.1	74.5	77.1	83.3	85.8	88.2	85.5	80.0
Source: Czech Hydrometeorological Institute

== History ==
The first written mention of Ktiš is from 1310, when the local church already stood there.

== Demographics ==
Historical population

Year	Pop.	±%
1869	1,739	—
1880	1,810	+4.1%
1890	1,734	−4.2%
1900	1,625	−6.3%
1910	1,637	+0.7%

Year	Pop.	±%
1921	1,717	+4.9%
1930	1,753	+2.1%
1950	607	−65.4%
1961	447	−26.4%
1970	527	+17.9%

Year	Pop.	±%
1980	500	−5.1%
1991	495	−1.0%
2001	508	+2.6%
2011	506	−0.4%
2021	467	−7.7%

Source: Censuses

== Economy ==
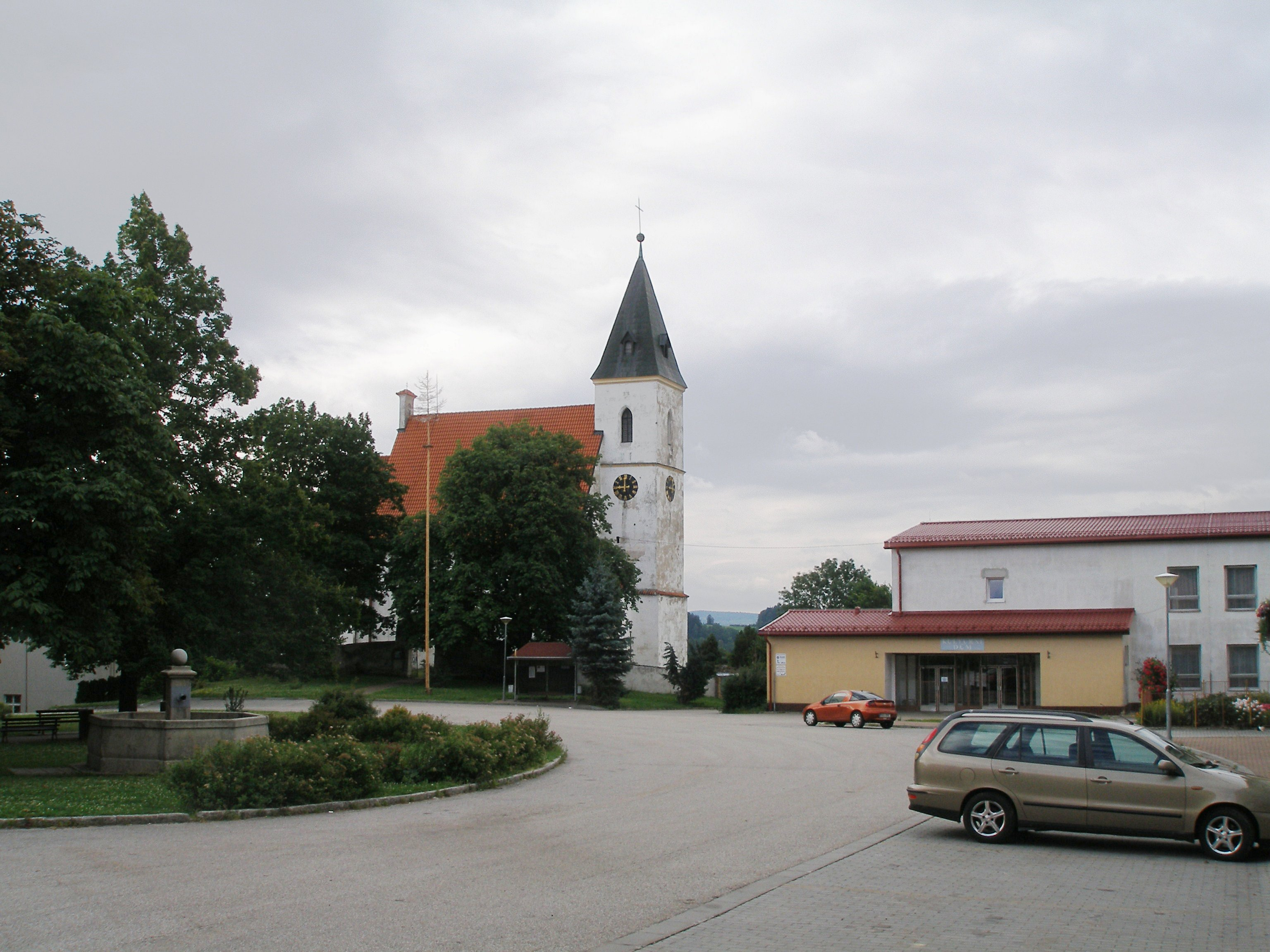
Centre of Ktiš

There is a deposit of garnet migmatites in the municipality, the only one in the European Union. Mining took place here in 1994–1996 and its resumption was considered in 2012.

== Transport ==
There are no railways or major roads passing through the municipality.

== Sights ==
The main landmark of Ktiš is the Church of Saint Bartholomew. It was originally a Gothic church founded in 1310, rebuilt and extended in the Baroque style in 1687–1690. A reconstruction took place in 1781. In 1878, the tower was raised.

A cultural monument is a niche chapel located near the church. It dates from the 19th century.
