= Lhenice =

- Market town
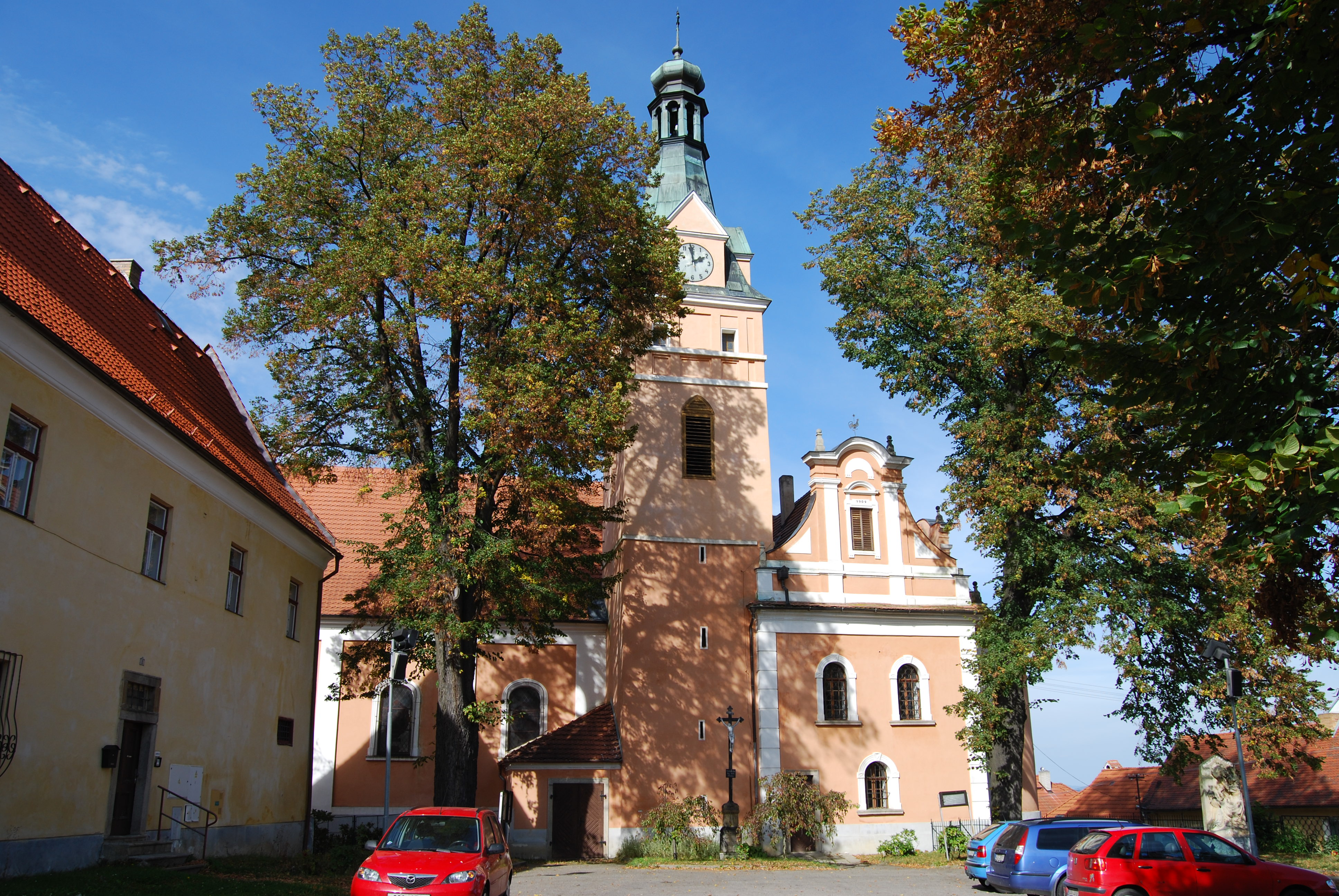
- Church of Saint James the Great

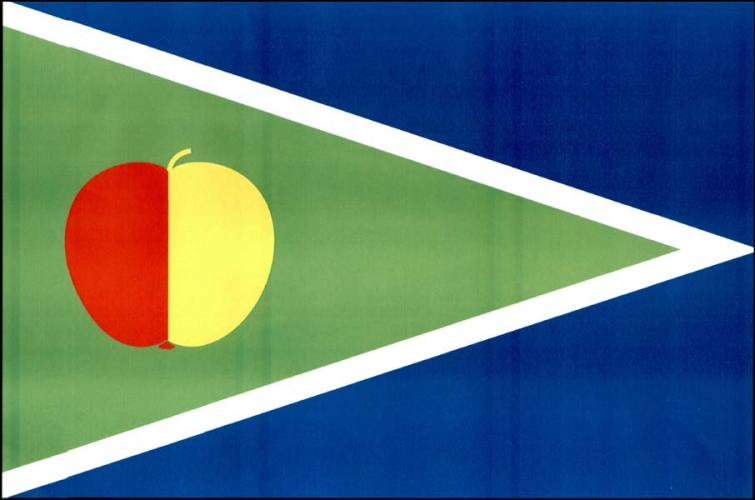
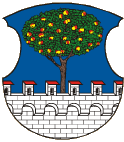
- Flag Coat of arms

- Location in the Czech Republic
- Coordinates: 48°59′42″N 14°8′59″E
- Country: Czech Republic
- Region: South Bohemian
- District: Prachatice
- First mentioned: 1283

Area
  - Total: 39.14 km^{2} (15.11 sq mi)
- Elevation: 559 m (1,834 ft)

Population (2026-01-01)
  - Total: 2,161
  - Density: 55.21/km^{2} (143.0/sq mi)
- Time zone: UTC+1 (CET)
  - Summer (DST): UTC+2 (CEST)
- Postal code: 384 02
- Website: www.lhenice.cz

Lhenice (Czech pronunciation: [ˈlɦɛɲɪtsɛ]; German: Elhenitz) is a market town in Prachatice District in the South Bohemian Region of the Czech Republic. It has about 2,200 inhabitants.

== Administrative division ==
Lhenice consists of nine municipal parts (in brackets population according to the 2021 census):

- Lhenice (1,554)
- Dolní Chrášťany (58)
- Horní Chrášťany (70)
- Hoříkovice (27)
- Hrbov (68)
- Třebanice (66)
- Třešňový Újezdec (54)
- Vadkov (81)
- Vodice (61)

== Etymology ==
The original name of the village was Lhynice and was derived from the personal name Lhyně, meaning "the village of Lhyně's people".

== Geography ==
Lhenice is located about 11 kilometres (7 mi) east of Prachatice and 24 km (15 mi) west of České Budějovice. It lies in the Bohemian Forest Foothills. The highest point is at 756 m (2,480 ft) above sea level. The stream Bezdrevský potok flows across the municipal territory. The territory of Lhenice is rich in small streams and fishponds.

== History ==
The first written mention of Lhenice is from 1283, when the village was owned by the monastery in Zlatá Koruna. After the Hussite Wars, it became part of the Tábor estate. In 1544, Lhenice was promoted to a market town by Emperor Ferdinand I. In 1547, Lhenice was acquired by the Rosenberg family. The next owners were the families of Schwamberg (1611–1622), Eggenberg (1622–1719) and Schwarzenberg (from 1719 until the establishment of an independent municipality).

== Demographics ==
Historical population

Year	Pop.	±%
1869	3,034	—
1880	3,044	+0.3%
1890	2,784	−8.5%
1900	2,775	−0.3%
1910	2,760	−0.5%

Year	Pop.	±%
1921	2,770	+0.4%
1930	2,672	−3.5%
1950	2,005	−25.0%
1961	1,959	−2.3%
1970	1,799	−8.2%

Year	Pop.	±%
1980	1,796	−0.2%
1991	1,782	−0.8%
2001	1,743	−2.2%
2011	1,784	+2.4%
2021	2,039	+14.3%

Source: Censuses

== Economy ==
Lhenice is known for growing fruit.

== Transport ==
There are no railways or major roads passing through the municipality.

== Sights ==
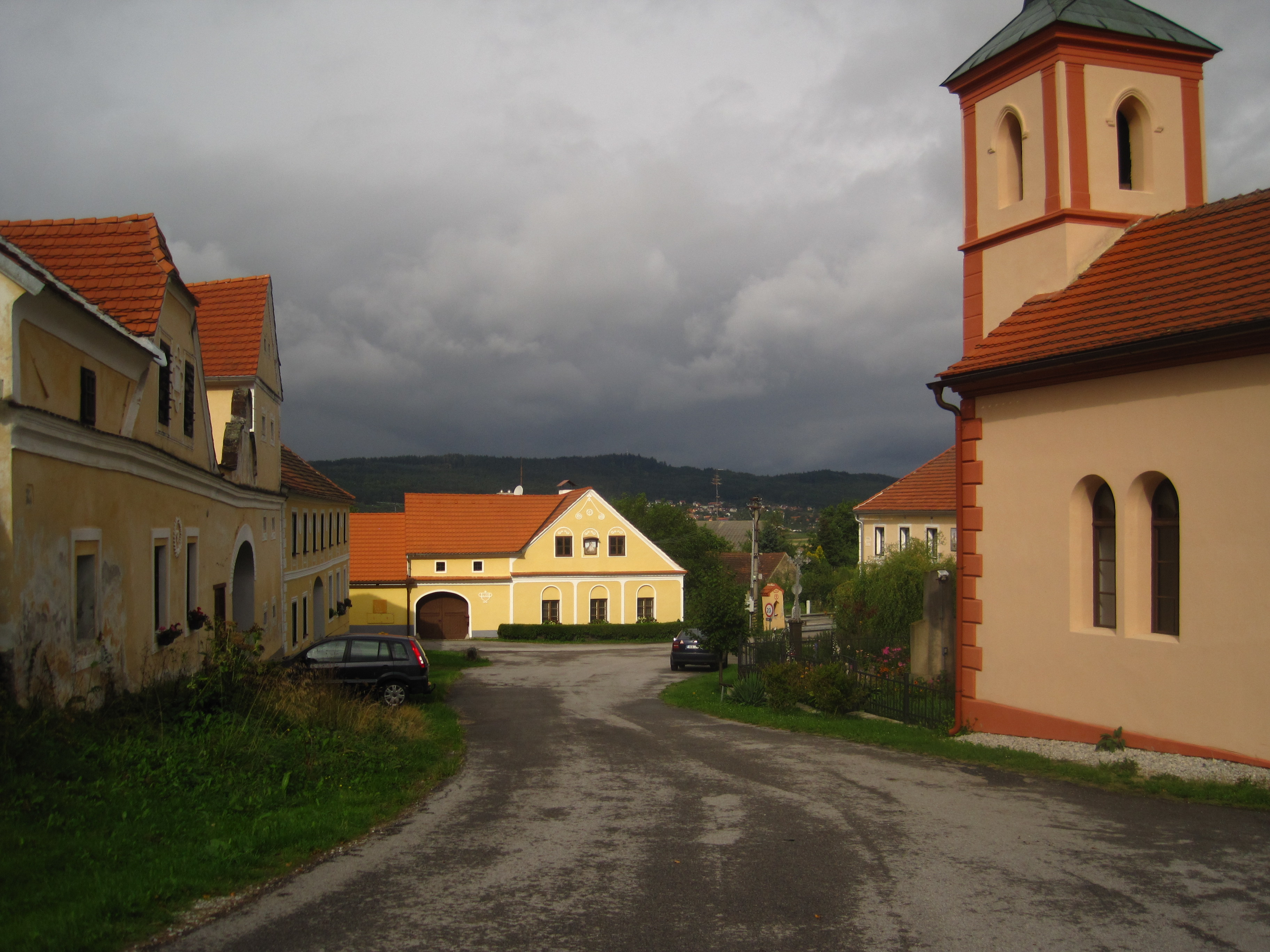
Centre of Vodice

The main landmark of Lhenice is the Church of Saint James the Great. It was originally a Gothic church, rebuilt and extended in 1734–1740.

The town hall is a valuable Baroque building. It was built in 1811–1814.

The village of Vodice is protected as a village monument reservation for one of the most complete sets of folk architecture in the region and intact urban structure of the village. Today's appearance of the homestead dates back to the 1860s and 1870s. For similar reasons, the village of Třešňový Újezdec is protected as a village monument zone.

== Twin towns – sister cities ==
Lhenice is twinned with:

- Budča, Slovakia
- Gurbrü, Switzerland
