= Malovice =

- Municipality
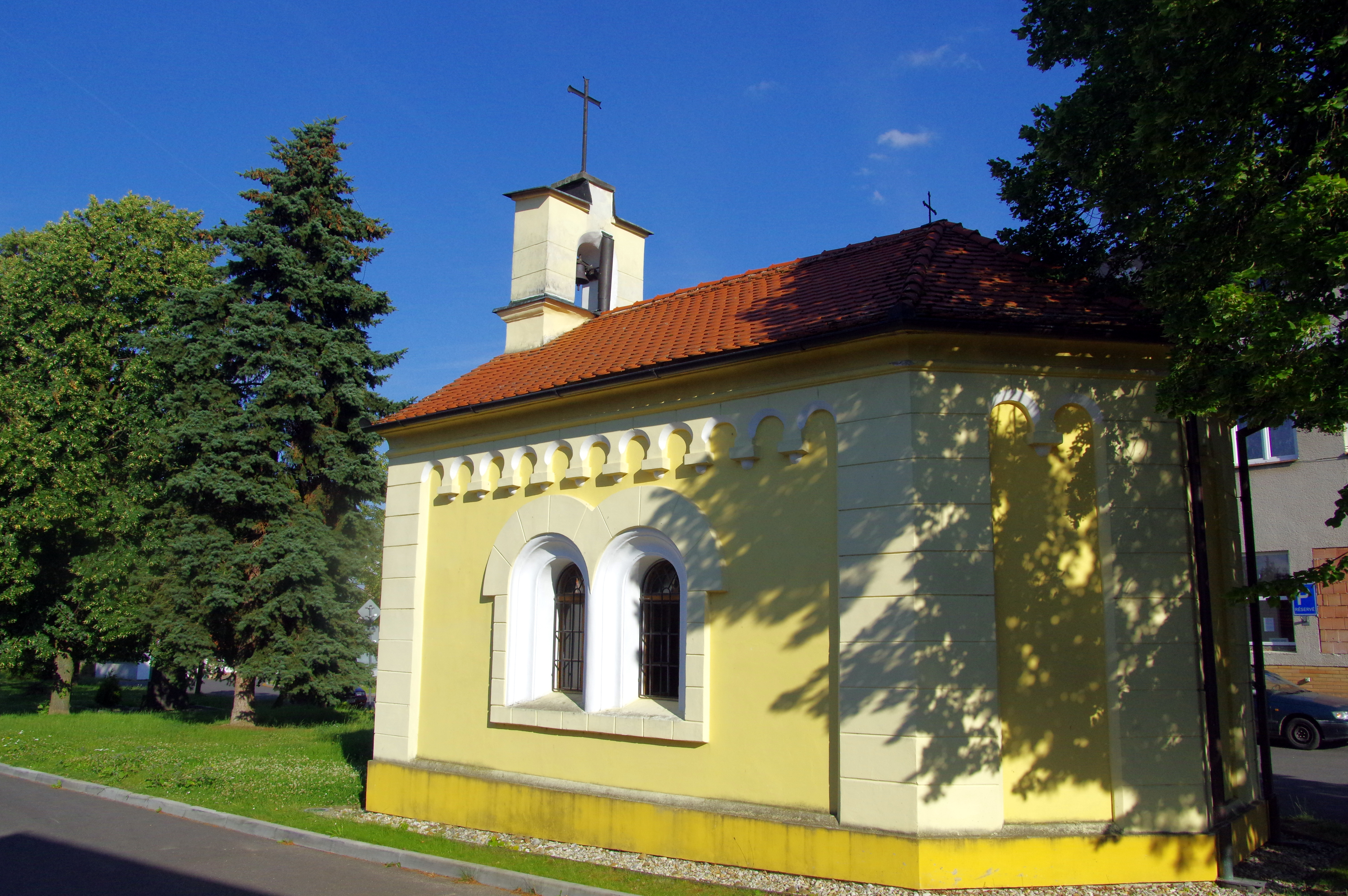
- Chapel in the centre of Malovice

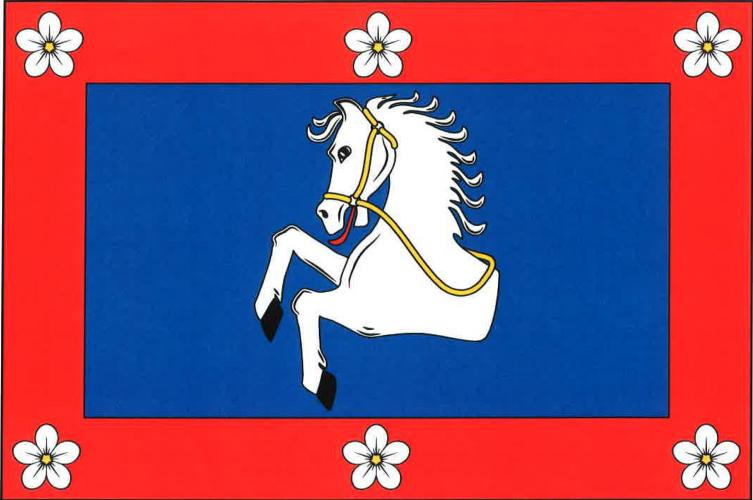
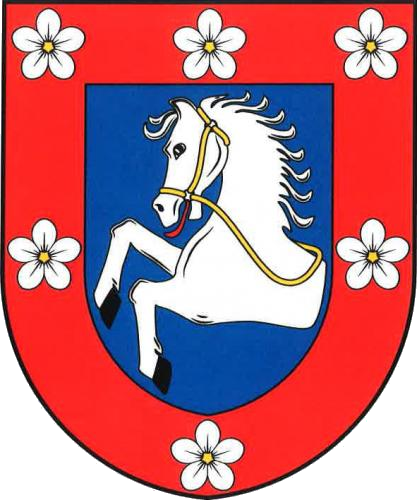
- Flag Coat of arms

- Location in the Czech Republic
- Coordinates: 49°5′29″N 14°13′33″E
- Country: Czech Republic
- Region: South Bohemian
- District: Prachatice
- First mentioned: 1315

Area
  - Total: 24.79 km^{2} (9.57 sq mi)
- Elevation: 411 m (1,348 ft)

Population (2026-01-01)
  - Total: 709
  - Density: 28.6/km^{2} (74.1/sq mi)
- Time zone: UTC+1 (CET)
  - Summer (DST): UTC+2 (CEST)
- Postal code: 384 11
- Website: www.malovice.cz

Malovice is a municipality and village in Prachatice District in the South Bohemian Region of the Czech Republic. It has about 700 inhabitants.

Malovice lies approximately 19 kilometres (12 mi) north-east of Prachatice, 23 km (14 mi) north-west of České Budějovice, and 112 km (70 mi) south of Prague.

== Administrative division ==
Malovice consists of six municipal parts (in brackets population according to the 2021 census):

- Malovice (211)
- Holečkov (33)
- Hradiště (50)
- Krtely (123)
- Malovičky (114)
- Podeřiště (105)

== Demographics ==
Historical population
Year	Pop.	±%
1869	1,316	—
1880	1,373	+4.3%
1890	1,218	−11.3%
1900	1,204	−1.1%
1910	1,266	+5.1%
1921	1,288	+1.7%
1930	1,189	−7.7%
1950	927	−22.0%
1961	846	−8.7%
1970	732	−13.5%
1980	696	−4.9%
1991	634	−8.9%
2001	647	+2.1%
2011	608	−6.0%
2021	636	+4.6%
Source: Censuses
