= Mydlovary =

- Municipality
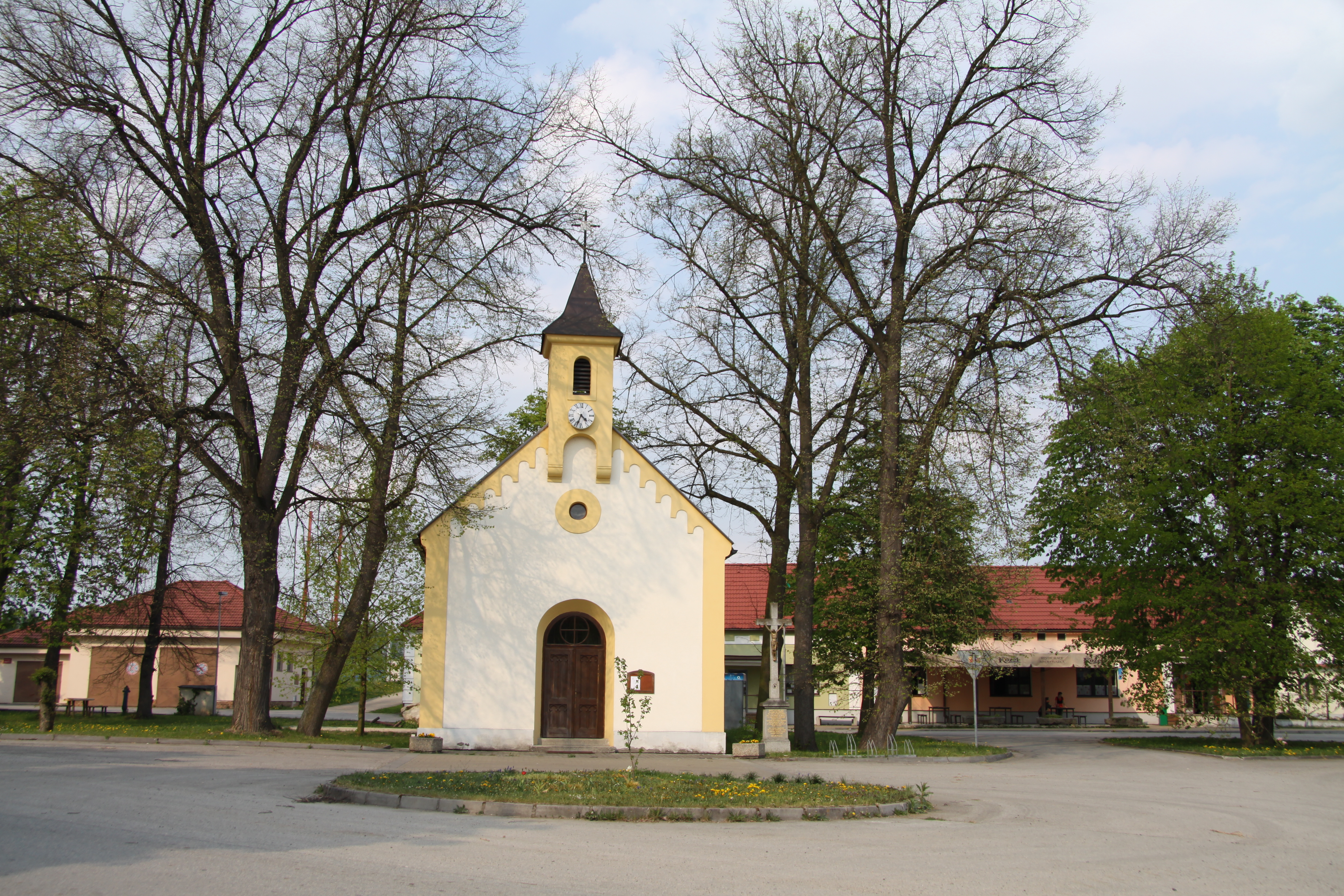
- Chapel of the Holy Trinity

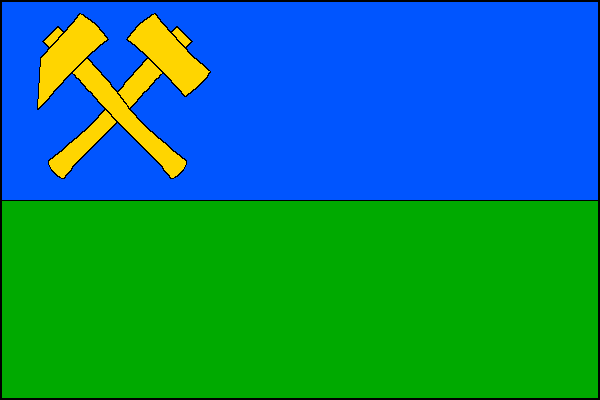
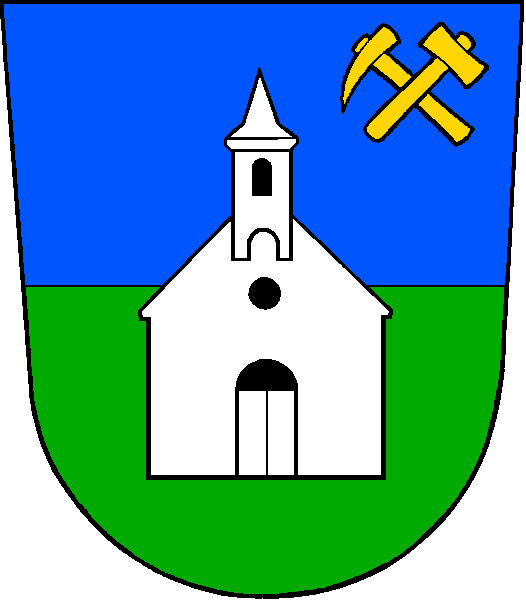
- Flag Coat of arms

- Location in the Czech Republic
- Coordinates: 49°5′28″N 14°21′16″E
- Country: Czech Republic
- Region: South Bohemian
- District: České Budějovice
- First mentioned: 1368

Area
  - Total: 4.12 km^{2} (1.59 sq mi)
- Elevation: 405 m (1,329 ft)

Population (2026-01-01)
  - Total: 299
  - Density: 72.6/km^{2} (188/sq mi)
- Time zone: UTC+1 (CET)
  - Summer (DST): UTC+2 (CEST)
- Postal code: 373 49
- Website: www.mydlovary.cz

Mydlovary is a municipality and village in České Budějovice District in the South Bohemian Region of the Czech Republic. It has about 300 inhabitants.

Mydlovary lies approximately 16 kilometres (10 mi) north-west of České Budějovice and 111 km (69 mi) south of Prague.

== Demographics ==
Historical population
Year	Pop.	±%
1869	271	—
1880	260	−4.1%
1890	319	+22.7%
1900	332	+4.1%
1910	309	−6.9%
1921	294	−4.9%
1930	364	+23.8%
1950	384	+5.5%
1961	413	+7.6%
1970	388	−6.1%
1980	342	−11.9%
1991	262	−23.4%
2001	272	+3.8%
2011	284	+4.4%
2021	298	+4.9%
Source: Censuses
