= Hlavatce (Tábor District) =

- Municipality
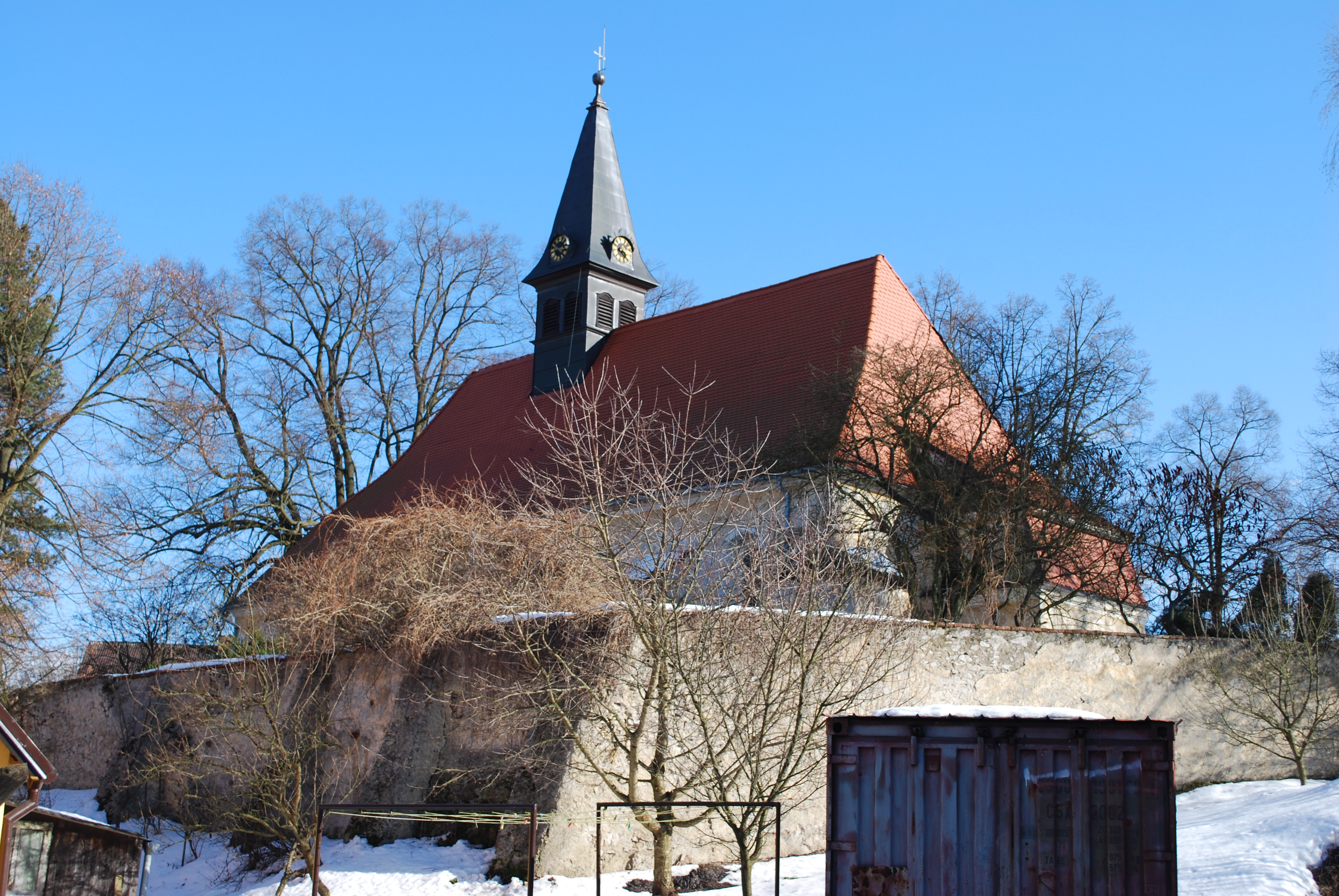
- Church of Saint Andrew

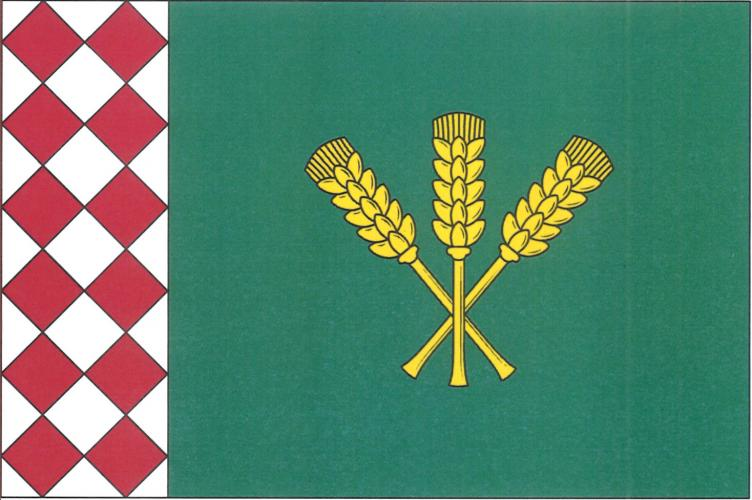
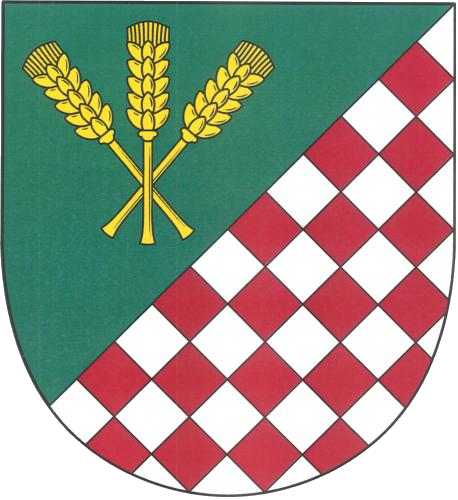
- Flag Coat of arms

- Location in the Czech Republic
- Coordinates: 49°17′44″N 14°37′16″E
- Country: Czech Republic
- Region: South Bohemian
- District: Tábor
- First mentioned: 1250

Area
  - Total: 19.36 km^{2} (7.47 sq mi)
- Elevation: 478 m (1,568 ft)

Population (2026-01-01)
  - Total: 432
  - Density: 22.3/km^{2} (57.8/sq mi)
- Time zone: UTC+1 (CET)
  - Summer (DST): UTC+2 (CEST)
- Postal codes: 391 73, 391 75, 392 01
- Website: www.hlavatce.cz

Hlavatce is a municipality and village in Tábor District in the South Bohemian Region of the Czech Republic. It has about 400 inhabitants.

Hlavatce lies approximately 14 kilometres (9 mi) south of Tábor, 38 km (24 mi) north of České Budějovice, and 90 km (56 mi) south of Prague.

== Administrative division ==
Hlavatce consists of three municipal parts (in brackets population according to the 2021 census):

- Hlavatce (287)
- Debrník (50)
- Vyhnanice (68)

== Demographics ==
Historical population
Year	Pop.	±%
1869	853	—
1880	862	+1.1%
1890	894	+3.7%
1900	866	−3.1%
1910	860	−0.7%
1921	804	−6.5%
1930	757	−5.8%
1950	560	−26.0%
1961	546	−2.5%
1970	502	−8.1%
1980	452	−10.0%
1991	410	−9.3%
2001	397	−3.2%
2011	349	−12.1%
2021	405	+16.0%
Source: Censuses
