= Hlavatce (České Budějovice District) =

- Municipality
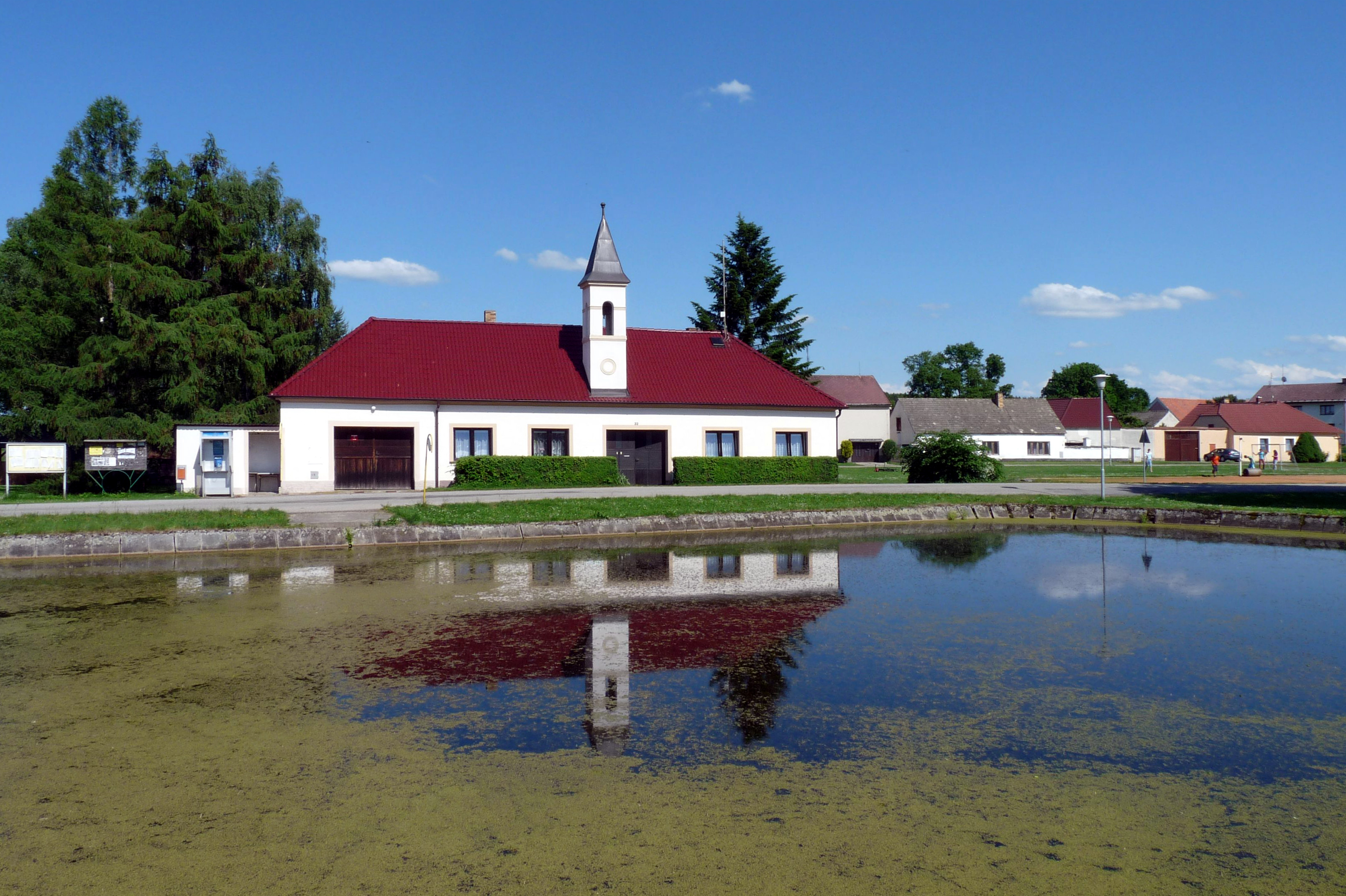
- Centre of Hlavatce

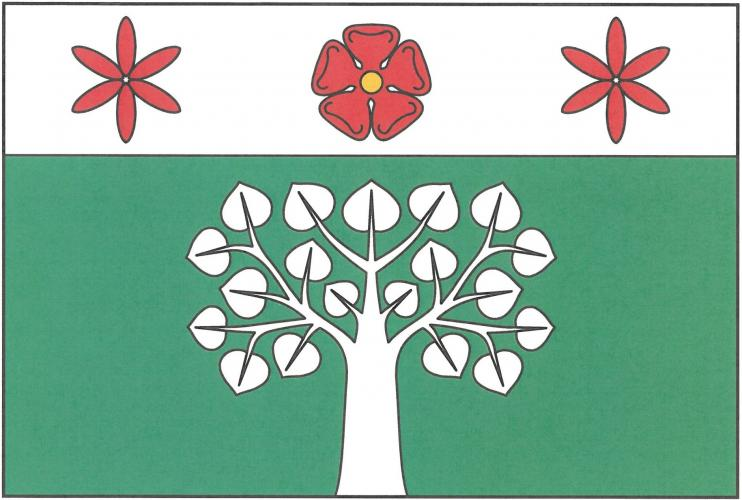
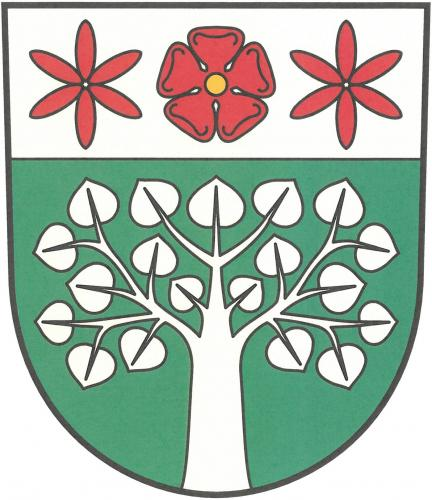
- Flag Coat of arms

- Location in the Czech Republic
- Coordinates: 49°4′3″N 14°15′47″E
- Country: Czech Republic
- Region: South Bohemian
- District: České Budějovice
- First mentioned: 1379

Area
  - Total: 5.04 km^{2} (1.95 sq mi)
- Elevation: 403 m (1,322 ft)

Population (2026-01-01)
  - Total: 146
  - Density: 29.0/km^{2} (75.0/sq mi)
- Time zone: UTC+1 (CET)
  - Summer (DST): UTC+2 (CEST)
- Postal code: 373 48
- Website: www.obechlavatce.cz

Hlavatce is a municipality and village in České Budějovice District in the South Bohemian Region of the Czech Republic. It has about 100 inhabitants.

Hlavatce lies approximately 19 kilometres (12 mi) north-west of České Budějovice and 114 km (71 mi) south of Prague.

== Demographics ==
Historical population
Year	Pop.	±%
1869	258	—
1880	264	+2.3%
1890	254	−3.8%
1900	273	+7.5%
1910	244	−10.6%
1921	281	+15.2%
1930	264	−6.0%
1950	170	−35.6%
1961	169	−0.6%
1970	118	−30.2%
1980	138	+16.9%
1991	147	+6.5%
2001	137	−6.8%
2011	138	+0.7%
2021	151	+9.4%
Source: Censuses
