= České Budějovice Basin =

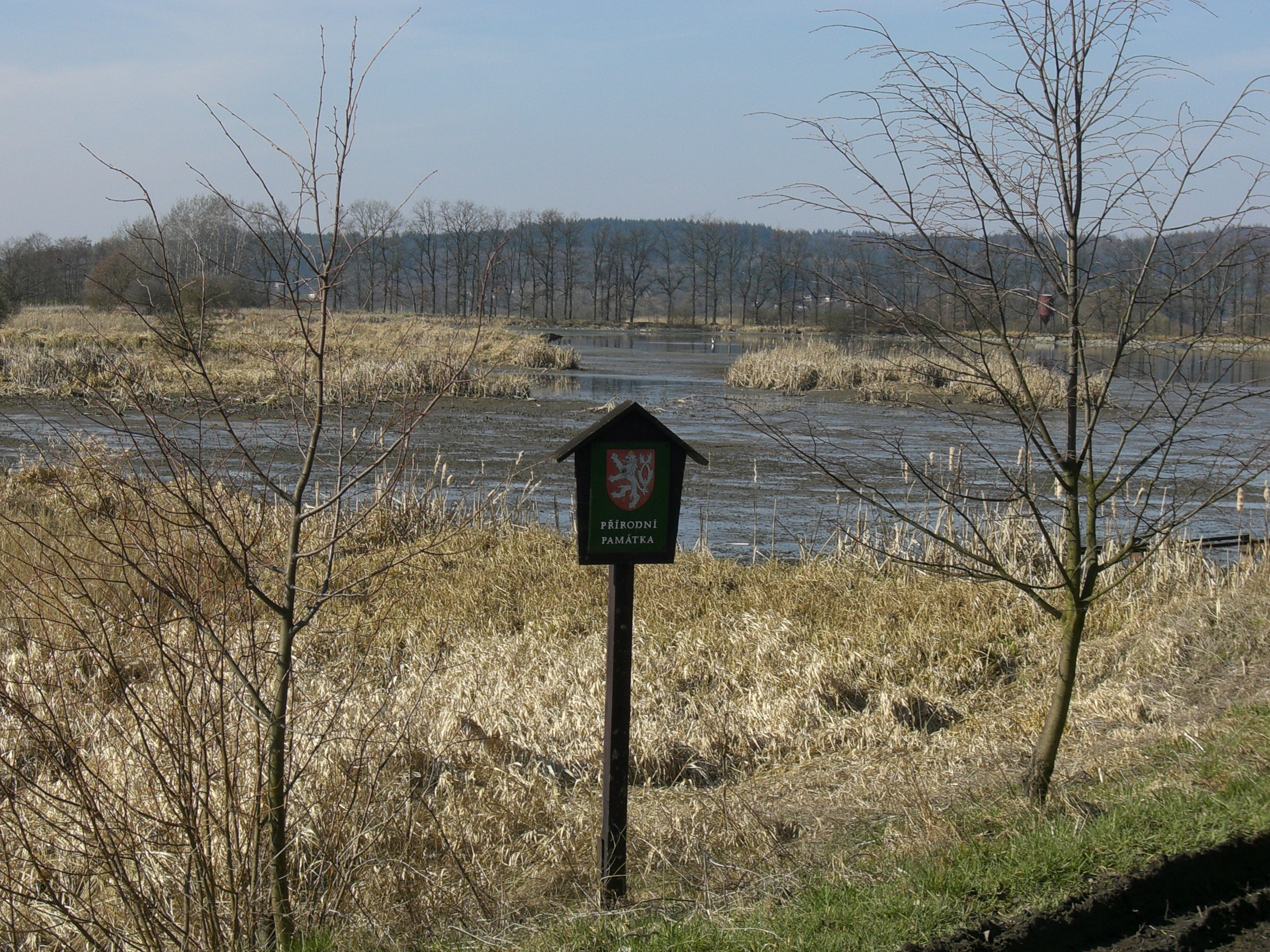
- Skalský Nature Monument

Highest point
- Peak: Vráže
- Elevation: 480 m (1,570 ft)

Dimensions
- Length: 69 km (43 mi)
- Area: 640 km^{2} (250 mi^{2})

Geography
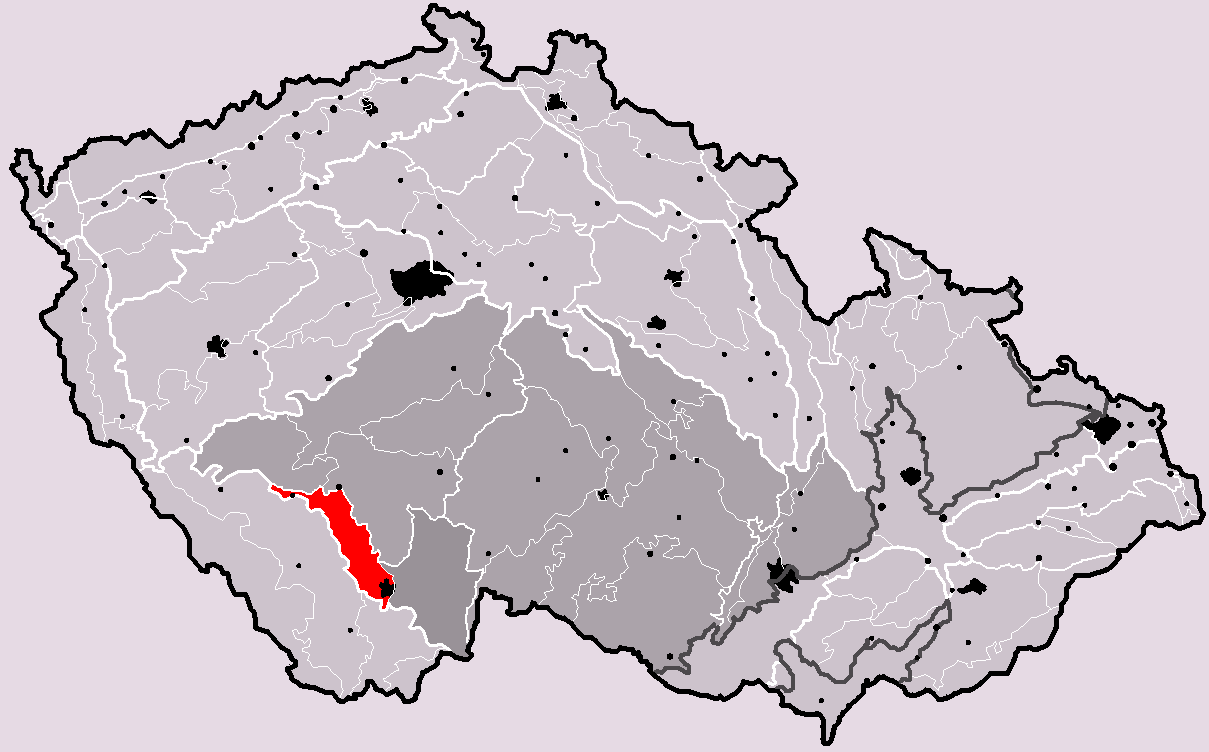
- České Budějovice Basin in the geomorphological system of the Czech Republic
- Country: Czech Republic
- Regions: South Bohemian
- Range coordinates: 49°8′N 14°16′E
- Parent range: South Bohemian Basins

The České Budějovice Basin (Czech: Českobudějovická pánev) is a structural basin and geomorphological mesoregion of the Czech Republic. It is located in the South Bohemian Region and it is named after the city of České Budějovice. It is known as a cultural landscape with numerous fishponds.

== Geomorphology ==
The České Budějovice Basin is one of the mesoregions of the South Bohemian Basins (the second being the Třeboň Basin) within the Bohemian Massif. It is further subdivided into the microregions of Putim Basin and Blata Basin.

The basin is a tectonic depression limited mostly by distinctive fault slopes, filled with slightly undulating to flat relief at a height of 380–410 m above sea level, which is the result of erosion and denudation processes after the emptying of lakes in the Neogene.

There are no significant peaks in the area. The highest hill is Vráže at 480 m (1,570 ft) above sea level, in the southern part of the territory. In the north there are the hills Skalský vrch at 476 m (1,562 ft) and Na Zámku at 463 m (1,519 ft).

== Geology ==
The České Budějovice Basin was tectonically formed during the Cretaceous. The surface of the České Budějovice Basin is made up mainly of Late Cretaceous and Neogene formations. The bedrock is crystalline Moldanubicum rocks that come to the surface at the northwestern edges of the basin. Extensive accumulation forms like gravel-sand deposits, loess clay, wide alluvial floodplains and peat bogs are typical for the basin.

== Geography ==
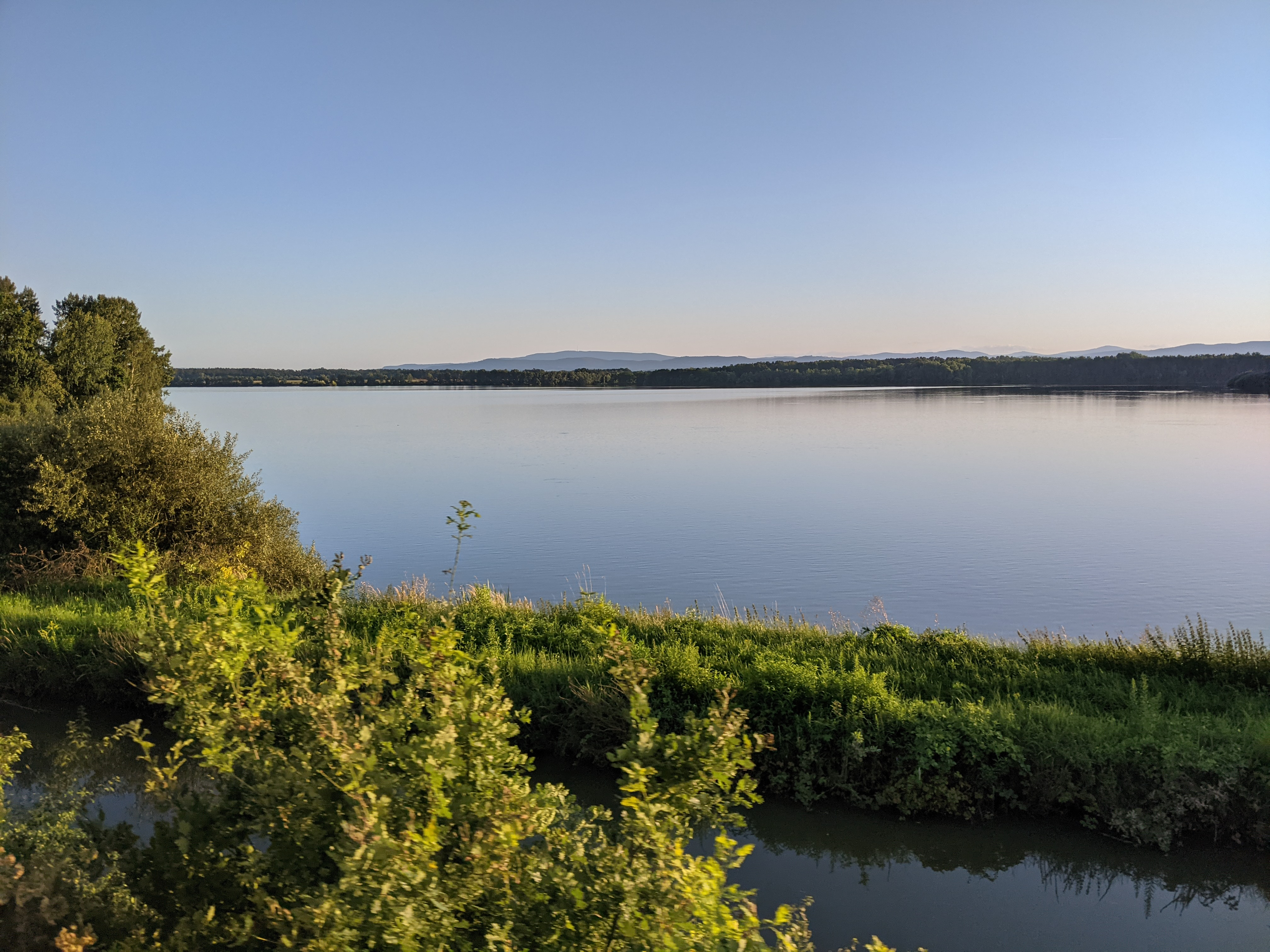
Bezdrev pond

The České Budějovice Basin has an area of 640 km^{2} (250 sq mi) and an average elevation of 408 m (1,339 ft). The territory has an elongated shape from the northwest to the southeast, which is almost 70 km long and 10–12 km wide.

The area is densely interwoven with many watercourses. The southeastern part is drained by the Vltava River. The Malše flows through the southernmost part of the basin and connects with the Vltava. The northwestern part is drained by the Otava River and its tributary Blanice.

The České Budějovice Basin is known for large amount of fishponds, which were established in the region since Middle Ages. The ponds Bezdrev (area 365 ha (900 acres)) and Dehtář (246 ha (610 acres)), which are among the largest ponds in the Czech Republic, are located in the basin.

The basin includes several large settlements, most notably the city of České Budějovice. Other large towns are Strakonice, Vodňany, Protivín, Zliv and the southern part of Písek.

== Gallery ==
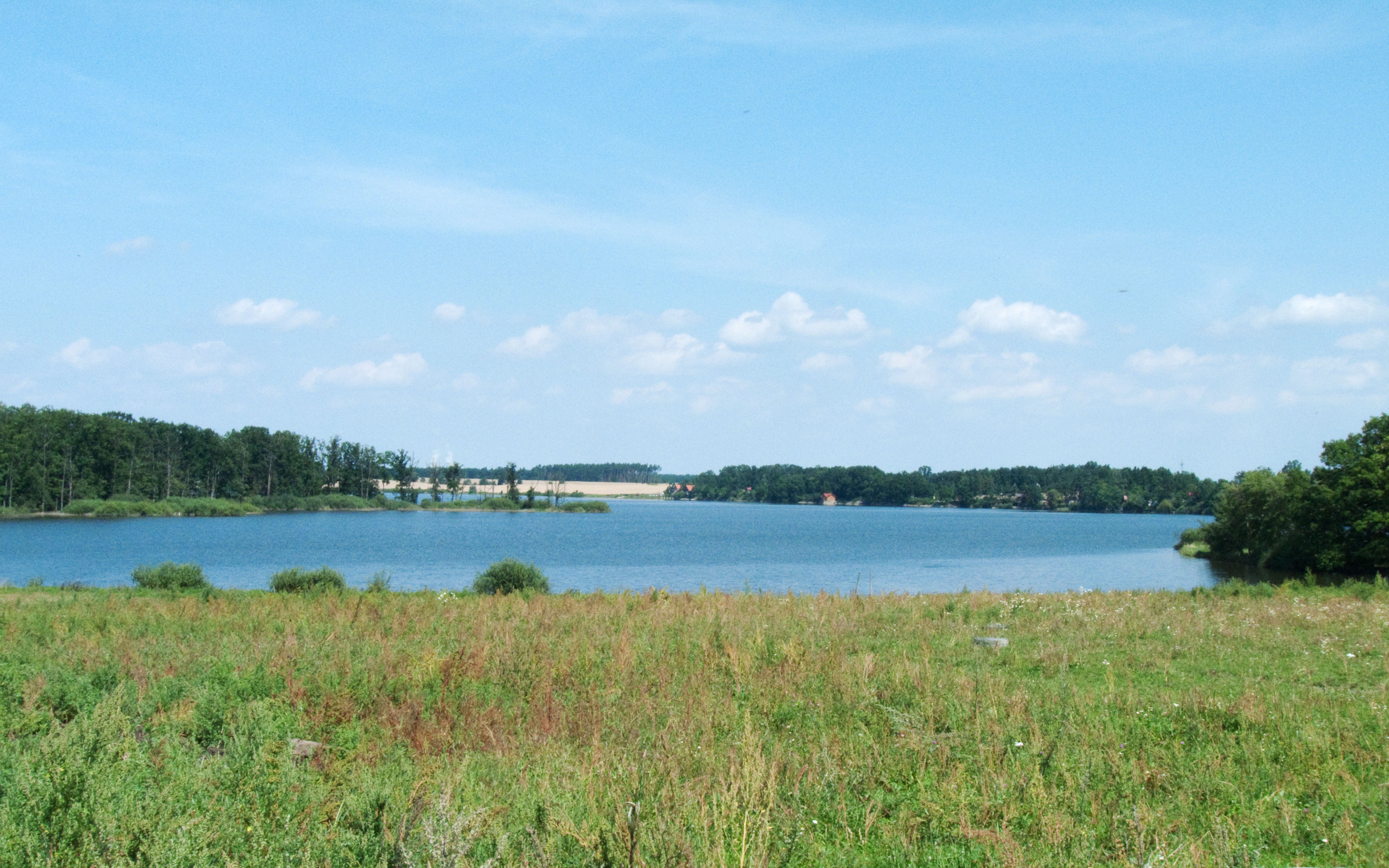
Dehtář pond

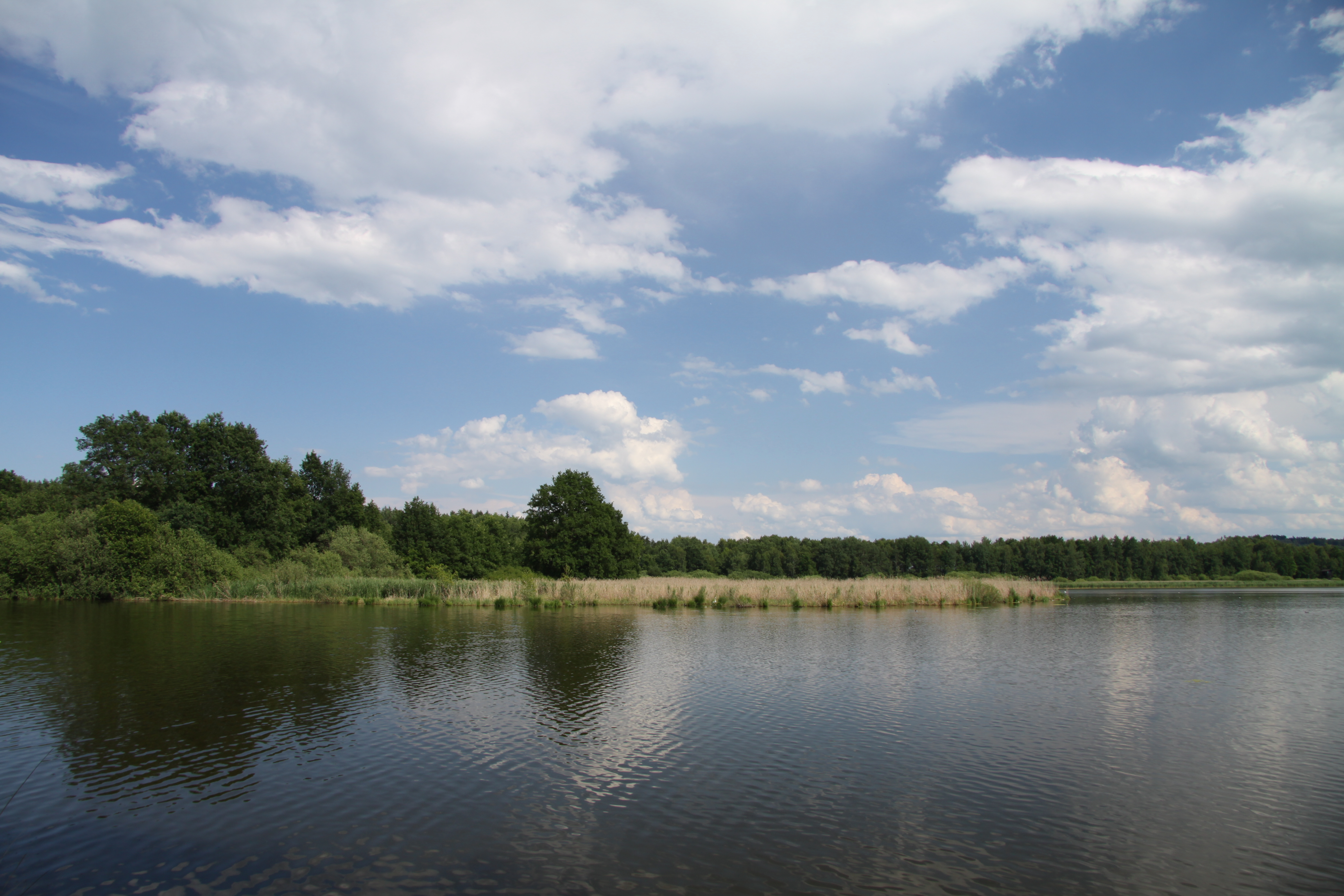
Řežabinec National Nature Monument

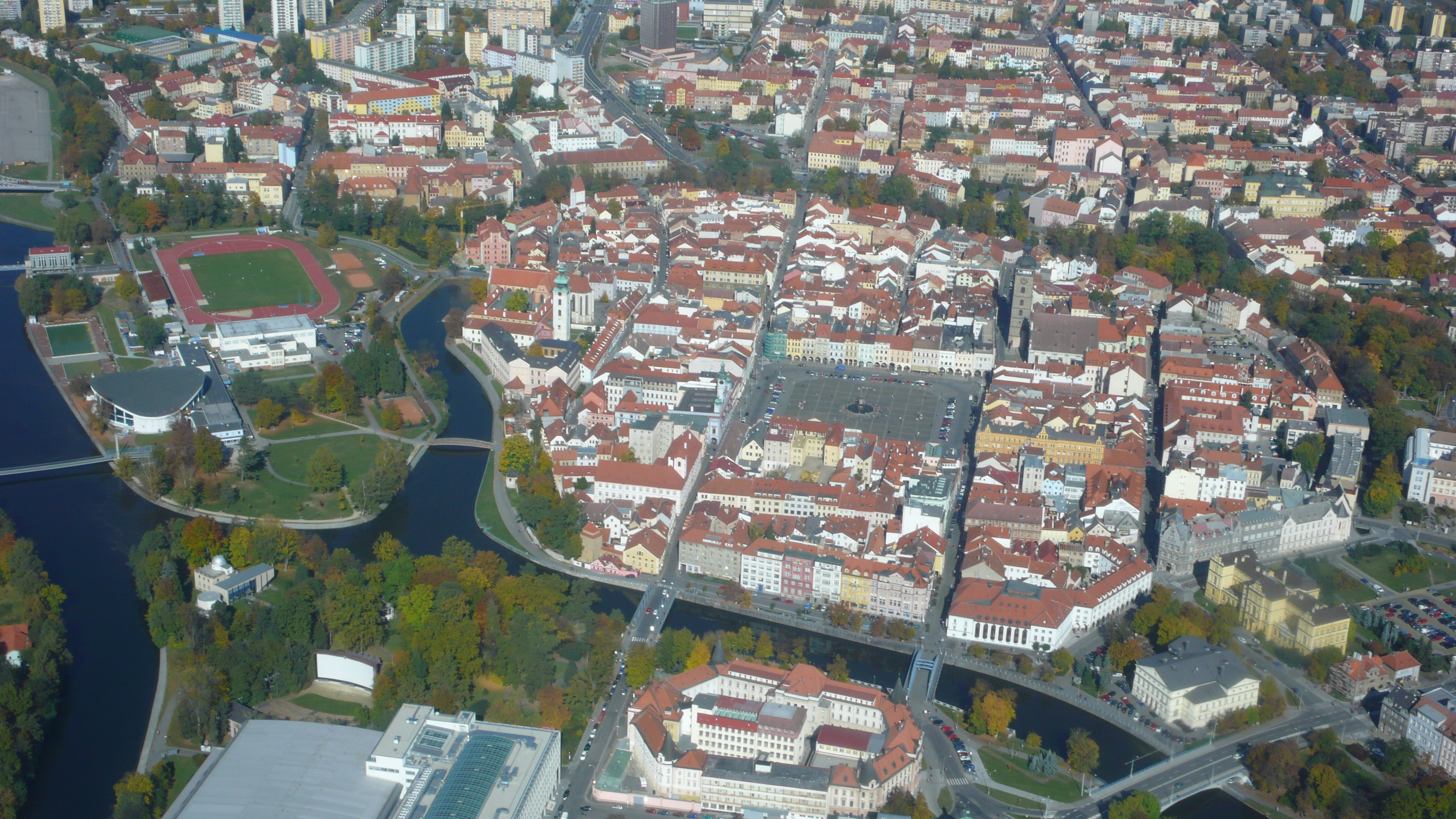
Aerial view of the centre of České Budějovice

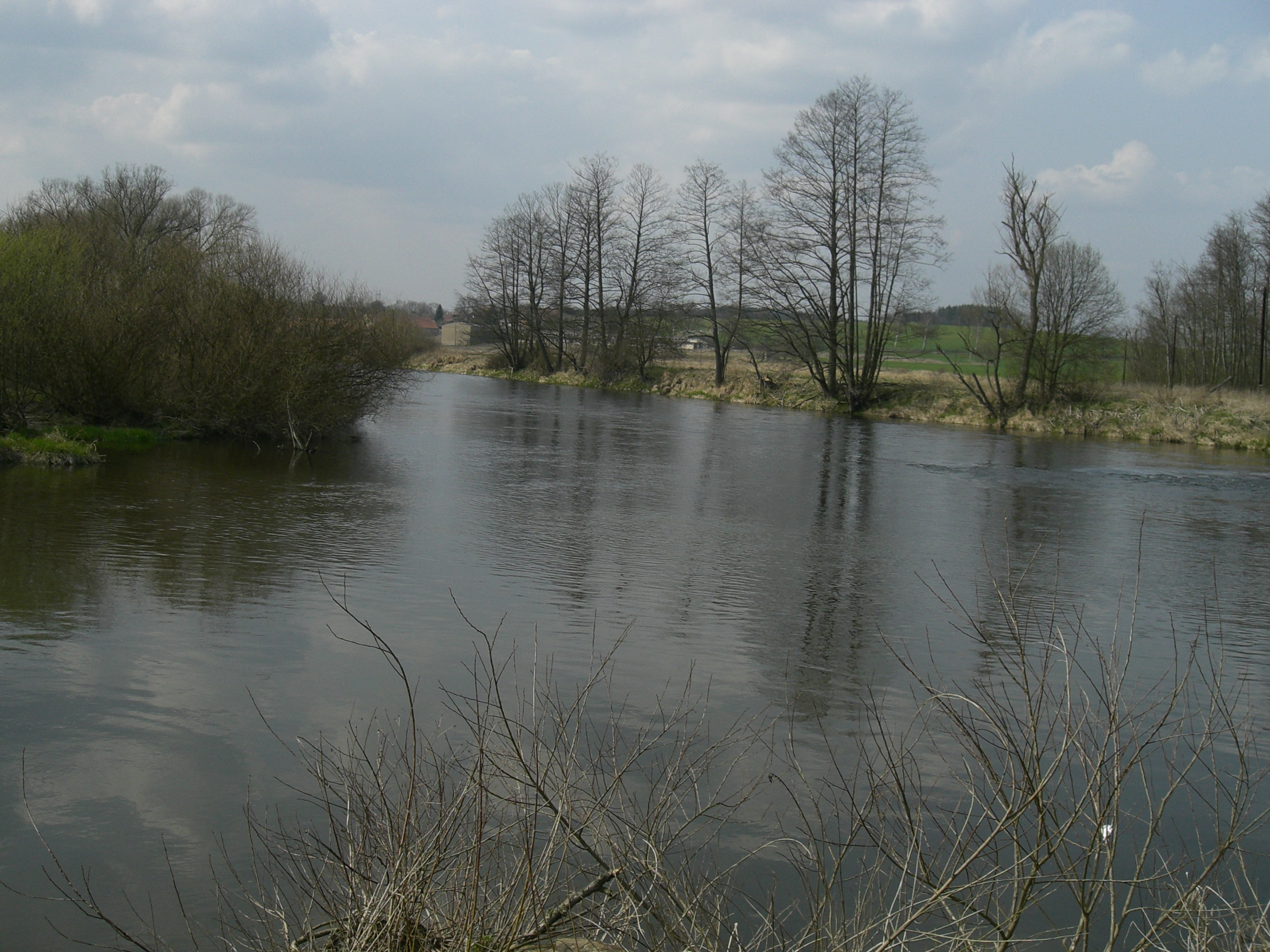
Confluence of the Otava and Blanice rivers
