= Adalbert Lanna the Elder =

Czech industrial magnate (1805–1866)

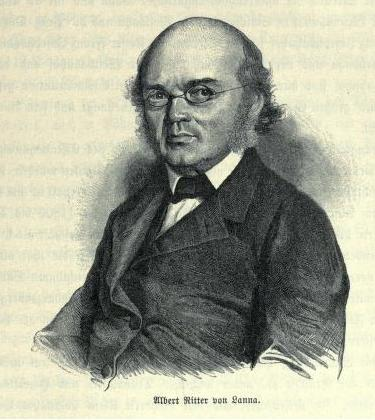
The portrait of Adalbert Lanna the Elder

Adalbert Lanna the Elder (baptized as Adalbert Joseph Lanna; Czech: Vojtěch Lanna starší; 23 April 1805 – 15 January 1866) was a Czech shipmaster, merchant, industrialist and builder. After success in the Vltava river trade with salt and wood, Adalbert Lanna the elder expanded his business into other areas such as construction, coal mining, iron processing or brewery. In addition to his native České Budějovice, he significantly contributed to the economic development of Týn nad Vltavou, Kladno and Prague.

== Life ==
=== Childhood and adolescence ===
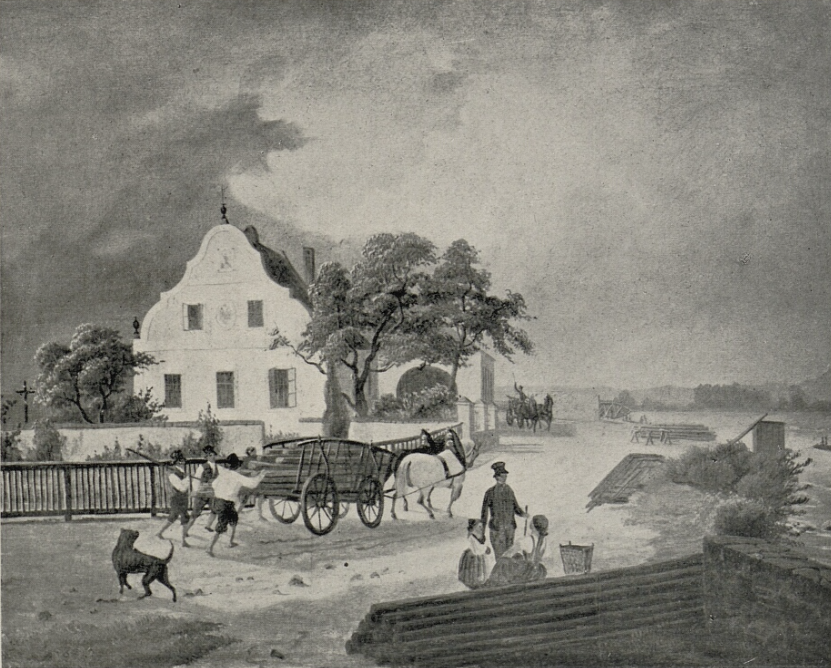
House of the Lanna family in Čtyři Dvory, undated oil painting by Jan Václav Kautský

Vojtěch Lanna the Elder was born on 23 April 1805 in Čtyři Dvory (today part of České Budějovice). He came from the Lanna family, who moved to České Budějovice from Upper Austria at the beginning of the 18th century. He was the second child of shipmaster Tadeáš Lanna and Terezia Lanna Sr. Like his older brother Jan and younger brother Ferdinand, Adalbert attended the České Budějovice gymnasium after high school. Jan went to Prague to study law in 1818, and the sixteen-year-old Adalbert Lanna the elder followed him two years later. Unlike his brothers, he chose the Prague polytechnical institute and showed interest mainly in mechanics and mechanical engineering. He was however expelled for disciplinary reasons, after disagreements with the director of the institute František Josef Gerstner. He returned home and worked as a crew member on ships sailing salt from České Budějovice to Týn nad Vltavou. He was also gradually taught shipbuilding by his father, he was in charge of selecting suitable trees in the forests and managed their processing. In 1825, he passed the exam authorizing him to be in charge of river shipments. In the same year, he sailed out for the first time with his own cargo along the Vltava river and the Elbe river to Hamburg. Adalbert's older brother Jan started working in Hluboká nad Vltavou as a lawyer for the noble house of Schwarzenberg, so when their father Tadeáš Lanna died in 1828, Adalbert Lanna the Elder was the one who inherited the family business, together with the financial responsibility for his mother and four younger siblings.

=== 1830s ===
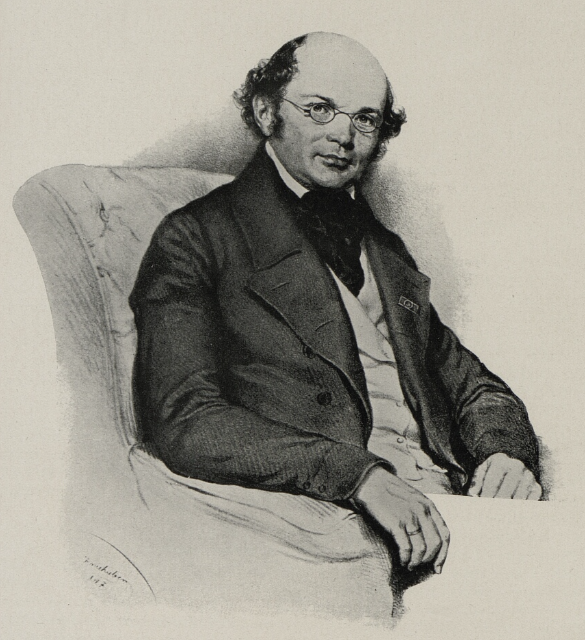
Vojtěch Lanna the Elder, gouache by Josef Kriehuber from 1847

In addition to salt, Adalbert Lanna the Elder also began shipping construction wood and graphite from Český Krumlov district. At the beginning of the 1830s, the construction of horse-drawn carriage railway between České Budějovice and Linz was fully finished. Adalbert Lanna the Elder managed to secure a lease for the operation of the entire railway for a few years, which helped him greatly in importing salt from Austrian salt mines. In addition to freight transport, the horse-drawn carriage was also used for passenger transport, the journey by horse-drawn carriage from České Budějovice to Linz took all day, and Adalbert Lanna therefore built a large inn at the main intermediate station in Kerschbaum. Despite the initial resistance of České Budějovice townspeople and merchants, he also secured permission from the Bohemian land gubernium for the extension of the northern end of railway from Linecké předměstí part of České Budějovice through the city centre all the way to the Green Branch Inn, which he inherited from his father. The Green Branch Inn was then used as a key point for reloading goods from the railway to the Vltava river shipping route.

Adalbert's mother died in June 1832, half a year later the Lanna family celebrated a double wedding. Adalbert's sister Terezie Lanna the Younger married a lawyer Tomáš Mikosch, and Adalbert married Filipina Peithner from Lichtenfels two days later. After a year and a half of marriage, Filipina suddenly died of internal bleeding. Half a year later, Adalbert married her younger sister Josefína.

As early as the 1830s, Adalbert Lanna the Elder was leased all river structures on the Vltava river between České Budějovice and Prague, and was responsible for their construction and maintenance. In 1833, Lanna's gained a lease of all river structures on the Vltava river and Elbe from Prague to the border with Saxony replacing the previous lessee Heřman Martinoves. He even tried to submit a proposal to Emperor Francis II that he would make the section of the upper Vltava river between Vyšší Brod and České Budějovice navigable at his own expense in exchange for fifteen-year monopoly on river transport along the given section, but his proposal was rejected.

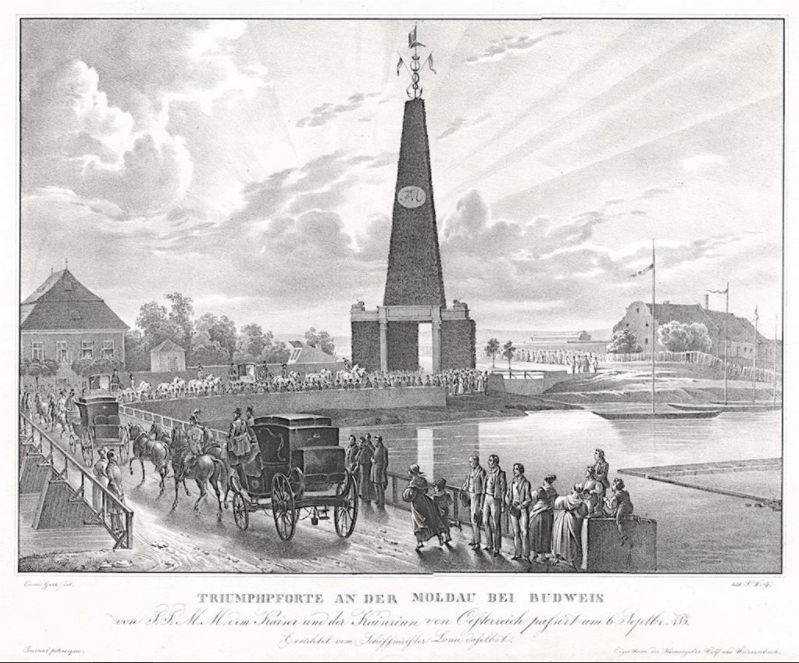
Festive gate at Lanna's Shipyard in České Budějovice, 1835

Adalbert Lanna the Elder was also aware of the importance of political favor. In 1835 he invited the Bohemian supreme burgrave Karel Chotek and k. k. court engineer Hermenegild von Francesconi who carried out regulatory work on the Danube river, for a river cruise along the Vltava river. This cruise was intended to help Lanna demonstrate the necessity and finished and planned regulatory constructions. In the same year, he seized the opportunity of Emperor Francis II's visit to České Budějovice on his way to Teplice. In the emperor's honor, he had a monumental festive gate with a 66-meter obelisk built right next to his shipyard and organized a crowd of his employees (river crew members) to hail the glory of the imperial couple. The appearance of this ephemeral architecture has been preserved thanks to a contemporary lithograph by F. Wolf. This costly undertaking certainly contributed to the fact that Adalbert Lanna the Elder was one of the six burgers of České Budějovice who were awarded a distinction by the emperor.

In May 1836, the first child of the Lanna couple was born in their house near the shipyard – a son Adalbert Lanna the Younger. The whole family was gradually gaining wealth as the value of all goods that traveled from Budějovice further down the Vltava river tripled just between the years 1832 and 1838 and a large part of the profits went to the Lanna family.

=== 1840s ===
In November 1840, Adalbert Lanna the Elder purchased Poříčí Castle with the adjacent estate and the village of Včelná and Vrcov from the Český Krumlov paper-maker František Josef Pachner. In his new seat in Poříčí, he rebuilt the local brewery so that he could brew beer using the new bottom fermentation method which was gaining popularity. He then founded a romantic English park east of the castle.

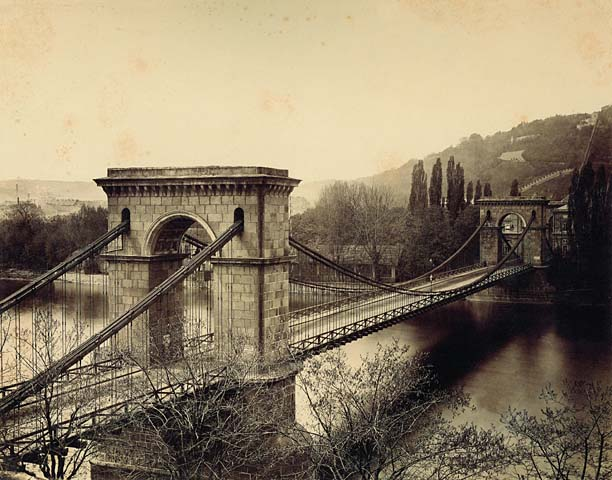
Bridge of Emperor Francis I in Prague on a photograph from 1885

In the same year, the construction of the Emperor Francis chain bridge in Prague began. Lanna's company supplied all the material. Wood was shipped from Bohemian Forest, iron was imported from the iron works in Chlum u Třeboně, construction stone was shipped from Těchnice (today at the bottom of the Orlík Reservoir), where Lanna established a new quarry for that purpose. At the time of its completion in 1841, it was only the second Prague bridge over the Vltava river. At the same time, Lanna's company also built Prague's first stone embankment, today called Smetana's. These buildings from the early 1840s foreshadowed the further expansion of Lanna's business interests. He participated in the construction of the first Bohemian steam boat, which sailed on the Elbe in 1841. From 1844 he began to regulate the riverbeds of the Nežárka and Lužnice rivers. A year later, he received a contract for the construction of the Prague's first railway station and participated with the Klein brothers in the construction of the railway between Prague and Olomouc.

From 1843 until his death Lanna was a corresponding member of the C. k. Vlastenecko-hospodářská společnost v království Českém ("C. k. Patriotic-Economic Society in the Kingdom of Bohemia"). In 1847, he offered to supply gypsum stone from Salzkammer in Lower Austria.

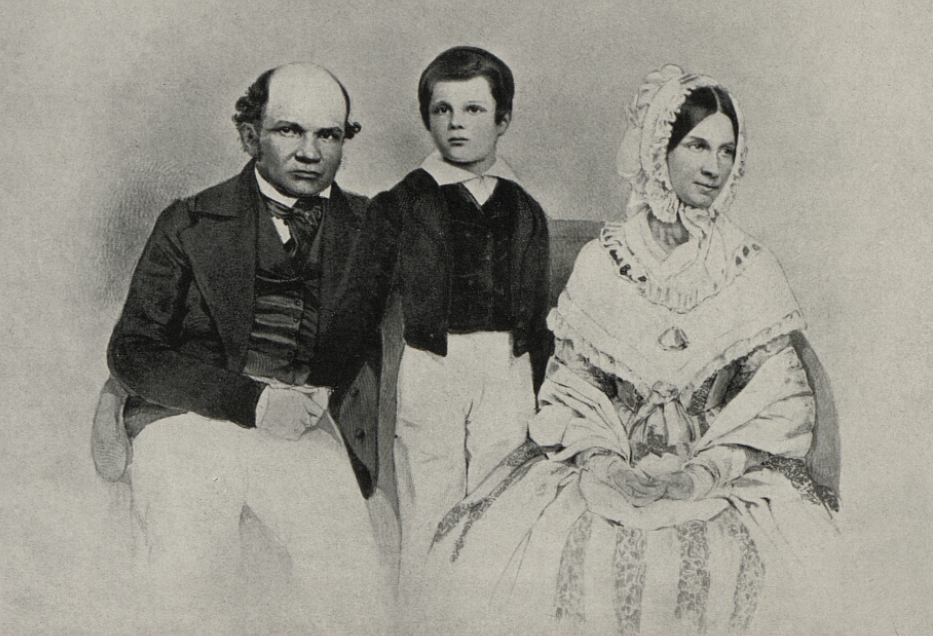
Adalbert Lanna the Elder with his son Adalbert the Younger and his wife Josefína, Josef Kriehuber's gouache from 1847

In 1847, the Blanice river was made navigable by Lanna's firm and the Stádlec Suspension Bridge over the Vltava near Podolí was constructed by his company. The completion of this bridge established a direct road connection between Písek and Tábor. The ceremonial laying of the foundation stone of this bridge was also attended by the incumbent Bohemian governor Archduke Stephan Habsburg-Lorraine, after whom the bridge was named. In the same year, Adalbert Lanna the Elder became involved in coal mining industry in around Kladno, when he founded a mining company with Václav Novotný, which was later joined by the Klein brothers. In Litvínovice, he rebuilt the old cloth making mill into a large sawmill manufacturing parquets.

In 1848, he was elected the leader of the České Budějovice national guard, which was established together with other guards after Saint Wenceslaus convention. In the same year, a daughter was born to the Lannas, whom they named Filipina after her aunt, who died prematurely. Abolition of serfdom – one of the permanent consequences of the Revolution of 1848 in the Austrian Empire - also affected Lanna financially, who lost subjects in Poříčí and other estates.

=== 1850s ===
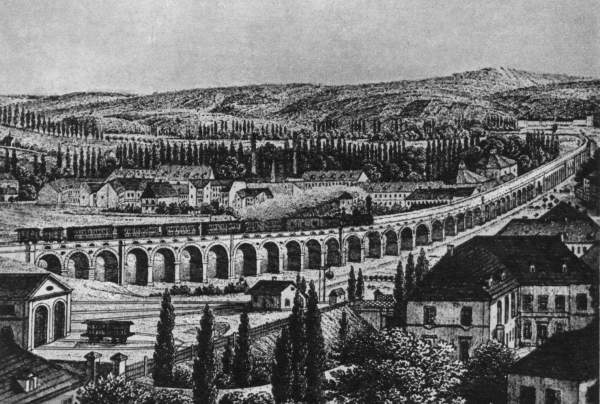
Karlín Viaduct, etching from 1854

In the summer of 1850, another important bridge in Prague was constructed with the participation of Lanna's company – Karlín Viaduct. This more than a kilometer long bridge was then the longest bridge in Europe for the next sixty years. In 1850, a law enabling the establishment of Chambers of Commerce and Industry was issued in the entire monarchy, and Adalbert Lanna the Elder became the founder and first president of České Budějovice Chamber of Commerce and Industry. A year later, České Budějovice Chamber of Commerce and Industry sent him to the Vienna Customs Congress, where he successfully lobbied for the abolition of navigation fees and customs.

In 1851, he also visited the first World Exhibition and used this trip to learn about operations in the coal and iron regions of England, Belgium and the Rhineland. After his return, he persuaded the České Budějovice Chamber of Commerce and Industry to organise a regional exhibition. The highest interest of the visitors generated the carvings of Jan Pták, who at the time participated on the ongoing extensive construction of the new castle in Hluboká nad Vltavou. A significant part of the production of the Litvínov sawmill and parquetry, which Lanna further expanded, also went to the construction of the Hluboká castle. In 1852, Lanna became one of the co-founders of the new joint-stock company C. k. privilegovaná pražská továrna na porcelán a zboží hliněné ("C. k. privileged Prague factory for porcelain and earthenware"), which took over the porcelain factory in Smíchov and also became a co-founder of an unsuccessful project of linen manufacture in Želnava in the Bohemian Forest, which was canceled after eleven years of operation at a loss.

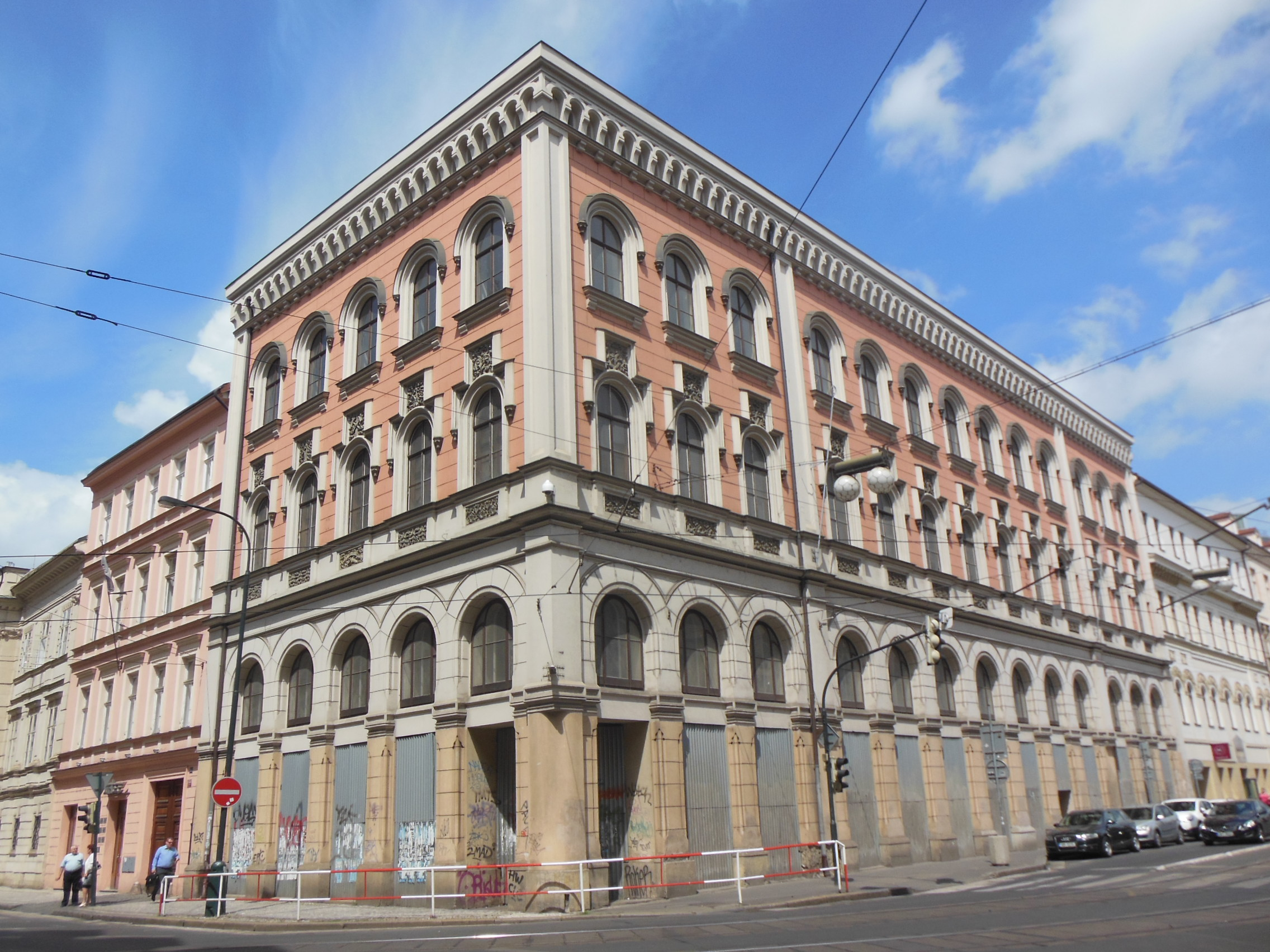
Lanna Palace in the New Town of Prague

However, his main goal at that time was to apply his foreign know-how and establish a large foundry in Kladno. Therefore, in 1853, Lanna founded the company Buštěhrad Railways, which during the next two years established a railway connection between Kladno and Kralupy nad Vltavou, which enabled better transport of coal and iron not only to Prague, but also its export by river to Saxony and Prussia. At the same time, Lanna started the construction of a blast furnace in his Kladno foundry, which he connected by railway with Nučice, where new deposits of iron ore had been discovered not long before. Apart from his older partners from the coal company, he invited the sugar maker Florentin Robert and the industrialist Hermann Dietrich Lindheim and together they founded Pražská železářská společnost ("Prague Ironworks Company") in 1857.

With the vision of the imminent construction of the Western Railway and in anticipation of easy sales, the Prague Ironworks Company began to invest massively in the expansion of its foundry. The number of blast furnaces increased to six, a new coke oven and steam-powered blowers were built. In order to have better supervision over the entire company, Adalbert Lanna the Elder decided to move with his family to Prague, where Jan Ripota built for him a new representative palace in New Town of Prague according to the design of Josef Kranner. The palace was built right next to the Prague Railway Station, which Lanna had helped to build thirteen years before. Because of the move, he also sold his south Bohemian estate in Vrcov. He had already sold the castle in Poříčí with the surrounding land five years earlier to obtain funds for the construction of the Kladno foundry.

However, the economic results of the Prague Ironworks Company fell short of expectations, and the construction of the Western Railway was further postponed. The company gradually lost its ability to repay its debts. The general meeting of the company in 1862 therefore decided to transform into a joint-stock company, and Adalbert Lanna the Elder, who was attributed the greatest share of the blame for the company's indebtedness, was forced out of its management.

=== Later years ===
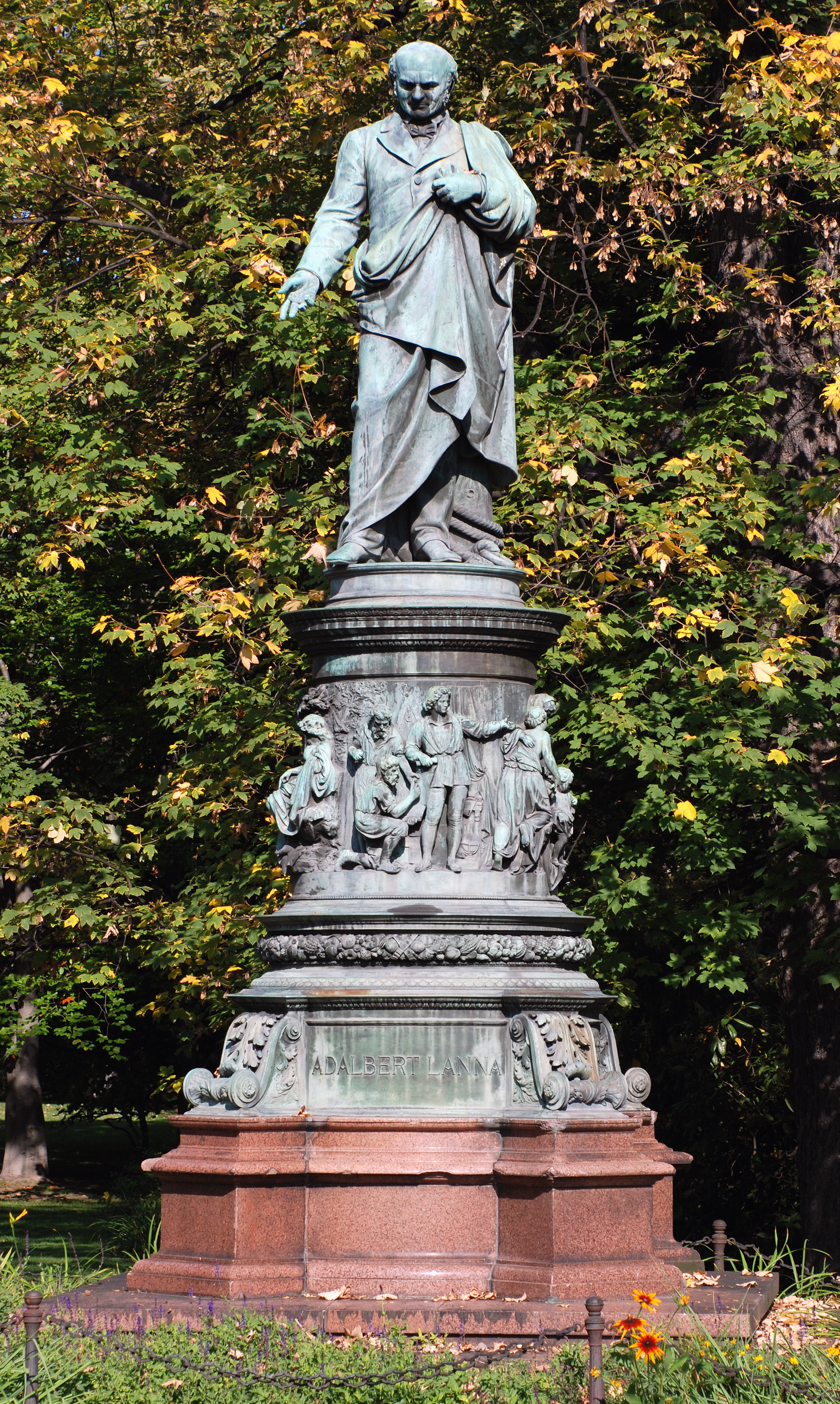
Monument of Adalbert Lanna the Elder in a park in České Budějovice

Lanna's health began to deteriorate, but he continued to devote himself to business. Lanna's family company together with the Klein brothers took part in the construction of the railway between Liberec and Pardubice and together with Jan Schebek in construction of the railway between Turnov and Kralupy nad Vltavou. Adalbert Lanna the Elder died in January 1866 in Prague at the age of 60 suddenly from a heart failure. Prague His son and successor Adalbert Lanna the Younger had his remains transferred seven years after his death to the newly built family tomb in Prague's Olšany Cemetery, which the Lanna family shares with the Schebek family. The Neo-Byzantine building was designed by the architect Antonín Barvitius, and was decorated by the sculptor Josef Václav Myslbek and others. It is the largest tomb in the area of the Olšany Cemetery.

In his native České Budějovice, the Monument of Adalbert Lanna the Elder was commissioned shortly after his death. The author of the monument Franz Pönninger unveiled it in 1879.

== Cross of Lanna ==
On 2 July 1824, the then nineteen-year-old Adalbert Lanna the Elder sailed on a ship loaded with merchant goods on the Vltava weir in Horní Lipovsko (today part of Dražíč-Vranov. In the right-hand bend of the river, the culvert in the weir was dangerously founded on the right side. Crew member Jan Vodrážka lost control, the boat broke apart and the Lanna began to drown. He was saved only by the fast response of Jan Mrzena.

In memory of this event, Lanna had a cast iron cross erected on a marble plinth with a description of the event. The inscription on it read: Zum dankbaren Andenken an die Rettung aus den Wasserfluthen bei dem am 2. Juli 1824 hier vorgefallenen Schiffsbruche. Der Vorsicht Gottes ewig weises Walten, Ergründet nie der Mensch in seinem Wahn, Was sich durch Zufall scheinet zu gestalaten, Ist ein Ohngefaehr - ist ewiger Plan. In English: In grateful remembrance of the rescue from the weir during the shipwreck here on 2 July 1824. The providence of God rules wisely forever, it does not influence man in his decisions, what happens by chance is thanks to God without danger, that's the eternal plan.

Due to the erosion of the bank, the cross was moved to Týn nad Vltavou in 1852 and placed on house No. 13 in Horní Brašov street. A new cross was placed in Lipovsko, which currently stands on a rock above the river.

== See also ==
- Villa Lanna
