= Monument of Adalbert Lanna the Elder =

Monument in České Budějovice, Czech Republic

- Interactive map of Monument of Adalbert Lanna the Elder

The Monument of Adalbert Lanna the Elder is a sculpture of Adalbert Lanna the Elder in České Budějovice in the Czech Republic. It is located in the Sady city park near the western end of Lannova třída Street. It was created between 1866 and 1879 in the Imperial-Royal Artistic Foundry in Vienna under the artistic direction of Franz Pönninger. It was paid for largely from a long-term public money collection, which was initiated by the city council of České Budějovice to honor the deceased Adalbert Lanna the Elder, who was a local native. In May 1945, it was torn down by a crowd, severely damaged and removed to a secluded place. Its partial restoration and re-erection took place in 1993.

== History ==
=== Process of creation ===
After the death of Adalbert Lanna the Elder, prominent citizens of České Budějovice met in January 1866 and agreed to establish a Committee for the erection of a monument to A. Lanna in České Budějovice. The members of the ten-member Committee included, for example: industrialist Carl Hardtmuth, mayor Eduard Claudi, lawyer Wendelin Rziha, manufacturer Johann Stegmann, and chairman of the České Budějovice Chamber of Commerce and Industry Josef Schier. The Committee obtained permission for a public collection from the governor of the kingdom of Bohemia Richard Belcredi and sent out appeals to a number of newspapers. Vendelín Grünwald, Hynek Zátka, and the bishop of České Budějovice, Jan Valerián Jirsík, were later also invited to the process of creating the monument. Jirsík proposed building an orphanage instead of the monument, which, in his opinion, would be a more appropriate tribute to Lanna's memory, but he was not listened to.

As early as February 1866, the director of the Viennese Imperial-royal artistic foundry in Wieden, Anton Fernkorn, announced his offer to create the monument. The money collection was taking off, among the largest contributors was Lanna's friend, duke Johann Adolf II of Schwarzenberg of Hluboká nad Vltavou. After a break caused by the Austro-Prussian War and the cholera epidemic in České Budějovice, another meeting of the Committee was held. This meeting was also attended by Wenzel Rosenauer – deputy of the Imperial Council, who lived mostly in Vienna. There he managed to obtain promises of further significant financial resources, among others, from the procurator of the Lanna company, Moritz Gröbe, and Anton Banhans (the future Minister of Agriculture). At that time, the Committee was still hesitant about who to entrust the creation of the monument to. In the end it was awarded to the Imperial-royal foundry in Wieden, which – in the meantime – had been taken over from Fernkorn by his successor Franz Pönninger. In July 1868, Pönninger sent his first proposal from Vienna, which already included the cylindrical pedestal covered by reliefs, on which the statue of Adalbert Lanna the Elder would stand. Further modifications were made during the course of the project, (Note: These modifications apparent, for example, when comparing the plaster bozzetto of the monument, which is in the collections of the South Bohemian Museum in České Budějovice, with the final result.) but finally in March 1874 Franz Pönninger committed to a final budget of 20,500 florins and the deadline for the erection of the monument was set on the autumn of the following year.

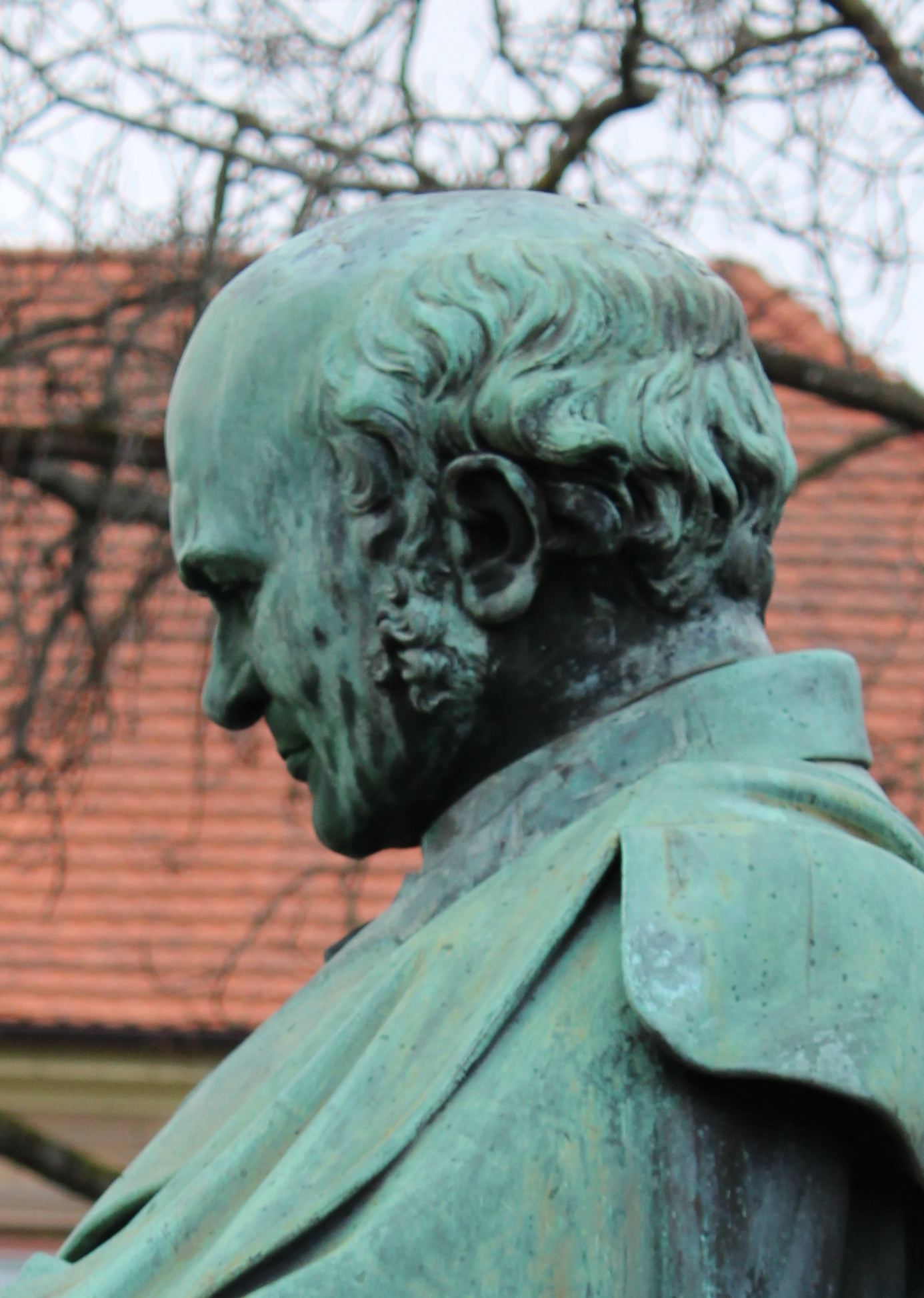
Head detail

In August 1874, Pönninger visited Budějovice and agreed with the members of the Committee that the most appropriate place for the monument was in the newly created Sady city park that replaced the former city fortifications. Erhard Ackermann – an experienced stonemason working in the area of Fichtel Mountains, who had already collaborated with Pönninger on the monument of Archduke Johann in Graz – was chosen to create the stone parts of the Lanna monument. The autumn 1875 deadline was not met; in December, Pönninger ordered a painted portrait of Vojtěch Lanna the Elder by Bartoloměj Čurn to be sent from Budějovice to Vienna so that he could better model Lanna's head. The date of the ceremonial unveiling was repeatedly postponed. The final date was set on 24 May 1879, after the iron columns and chains surrounding the monument were symbolically cast in the "Adalbert's Smelter" (Vojtěšská Huť in Czech) – a smelter which Adalbert Lanna the Elder himself founded.

=== Unveiling ceremony ===
The ceremony began with a catholic service in the monastery church of the Presentation of the Virgin Mary, celebrated by Bishop Jirsík of Budějovice. All the ceremonial guests then walked in a procession to the decorated area in front of the covered monument. The mayor and chairman of the Committee Eduard Claudi gave his speech, and the author of the work, Franz Pönninger, then unveiled the monument. Afterwards followed the performances of a number of choirs, the two main Budějovice choirs (Liedertafel and Beseda) even temporarily suspended their mutual boycott (because of nationalist division between the two) and both performed at the ceremony. These performances were followed by traditional wreath-laying. Among the participant who laid their wreath were, for example, railway manager Georg Löw, Prague politician Franz Schmeykal, Prague banker Karl Amadeus Ritter von Zdekauer, the Elbe Society (Labský spolek in Czech) or the Ship Society (Lodní spolek in Czech) from Ústí nad Labem. A narrow group of selected guests then went to a banquet hosted in the House of the German Society. A letter was sent from Würzburg by Dr. Friedrich Scanzoni von Lichtenfels – a member of the Bavarian Royal Secret Council – who apologized for his absence at the unveiling ceremony. He was a relative of Adalbert Lanna the Elder and spent part of his life in Budějovice. A series of toasts followed in honour of Lanna's memory. His son Adalbert Lanna the Younger was named an honorary citizen of České Budějovice, to which he responded by contributing 10,000 florins to the city's orphan fund.

Johann Rundensteiner, one of the first professional photographers settled in České Budějovice, was also present at the festive events, and captured them in his photographs. High-quality photographs of the newly unveiled monument were also taken by another photographer Josef Woldan.

=== The first period of existence ===
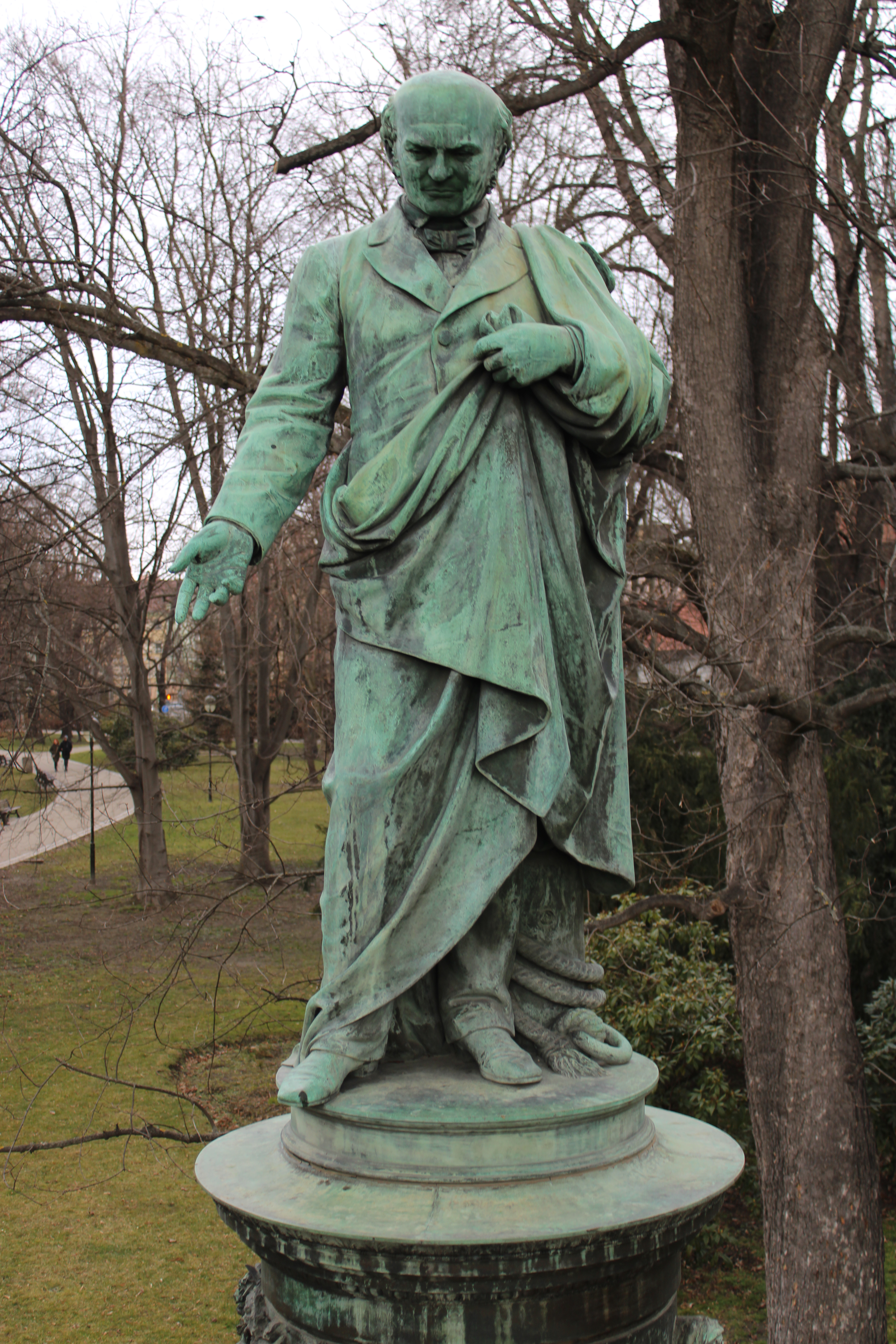
Portrait of the statue

After only three months after the unveiling of the monument, Franz Pönninger had to respond to the city council's complaints about rust stains that had formed on the monument. The mutual correspondence regarding technical defects then continued for at least another four years. During this time, other sculptural works were added to the Sady city park – a statue of the goddess Diana (1881) and then a monument with a bust of the Emperor Joseph II by Viktor Oskar Tilgner (1883) – one of the reactions to the proclamation of the Stremayr language decrees, that improved the position of Czech language in Bohemia.

The monument to Joseph II was torn down and thrown into the Mill ditch (Mlýnská stoka in Czech) after the proclamation of the Czechoslovak Republic in 1918, while the Lanna monument remained unharmed. It even survived World War II, during which almost all large metal objects in the Protectorate of Bohemia and Moravia were put on a list, collected and melted down for military purposes. The monument to Adalbert Lanna the Elder was the only bronze monument in the district to be removed from the list, thanks to the intervention by Bureau of Monuments in Prague and Fridrich David – Government Commissioner for České Budějovice.

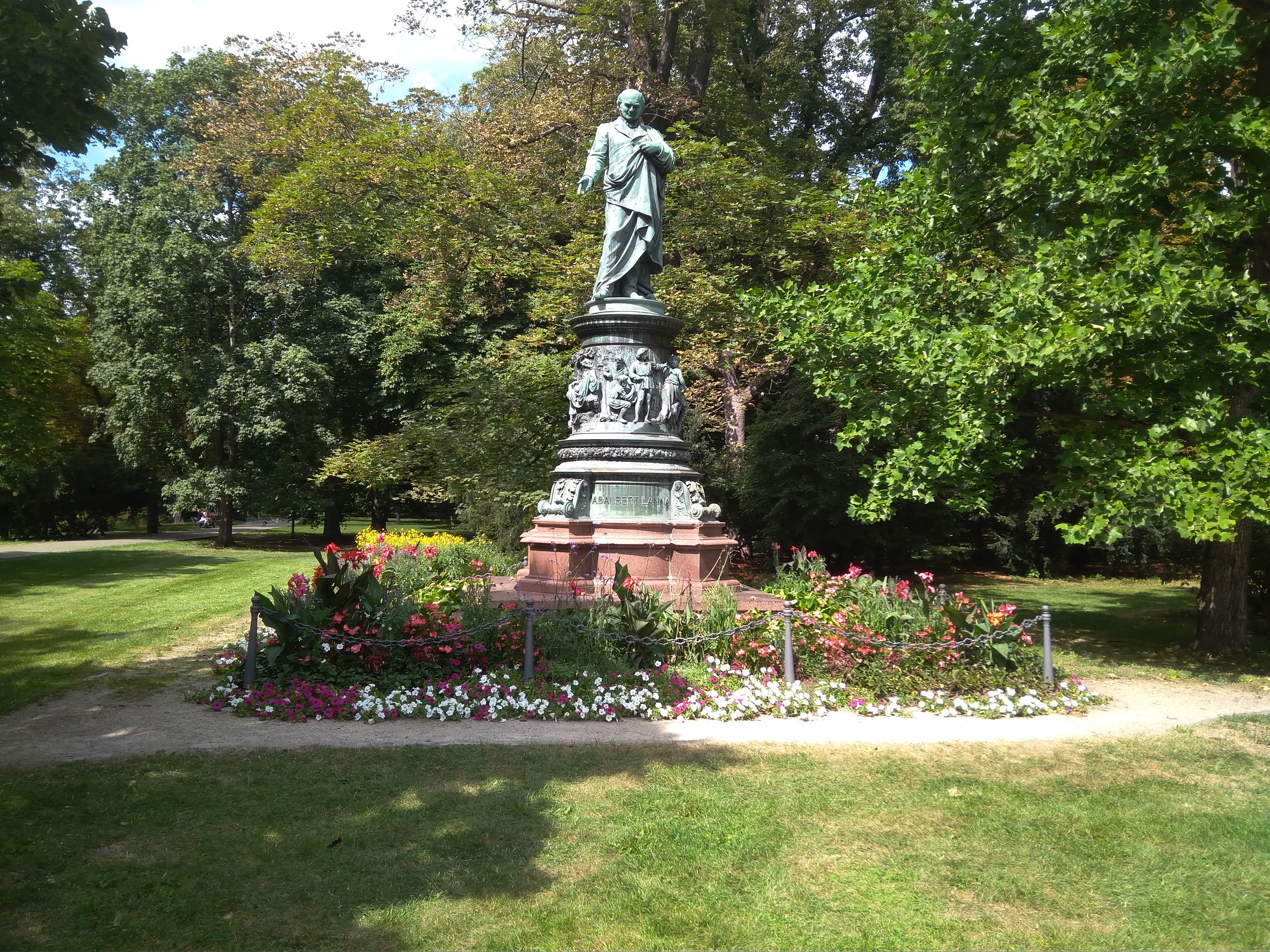
Monument with surrounding flowerbed during summer

Although the monument survived both World wars, it was torn down 16 days after the German surrender in May 1945. During the night, surrounded by a crowd, the monument was tied to a tractor with chains and ropes and pulled to the ground with the assistance of Soviet army sappers. The post-war renovation of the entire Sady city park started in September 1946 and was completed only two years later. Originally, the work was to be carried out by German prisoners from concentration camp who were awaiting mass deportation, but in the end it was decided to assign the work to regular prisoners held in the České Budějovice prison in the Palace of Justice. The statue of the goddess Diana disappeared and the Neoclassical gazebo called the "Templ" was torn down after almost 130 years of existence.

The damaged Lanna monument was moved to the Lanna shipyard, then it was moved to the school yard of the Dukelská primary school and it was eventually placed in the Bavorovice depository of the South Bohemian Museum.

In 1963, Karel Kakuška, a worker of the České Budějovice branch of the State Institute of Historic and Natural Preservation, began working on a proposal for the restoration of the monument. The entire long process was not completed until the events of 1968, after which the restoration of a monument dedicated to the České Budějovice businessman and industrialist was once again out of the question.

=== Restoration ===
In 1991, the South Bohemian Museum transferred the property rights to the damaged monument to the city. It was subsequently transported to the garden of the house of academic sculptor Ivan Tlášek in Libníč, who restored it. New, thinner columns and chains were also cast and the entire monument was newly erected deeper in the park than its original location and slightly rotated so that its front edge is no longer parallel to the edge of the street. The entire monument was ceremonially re-unveiled on 2 October 1993.

== Elements of the monument ==
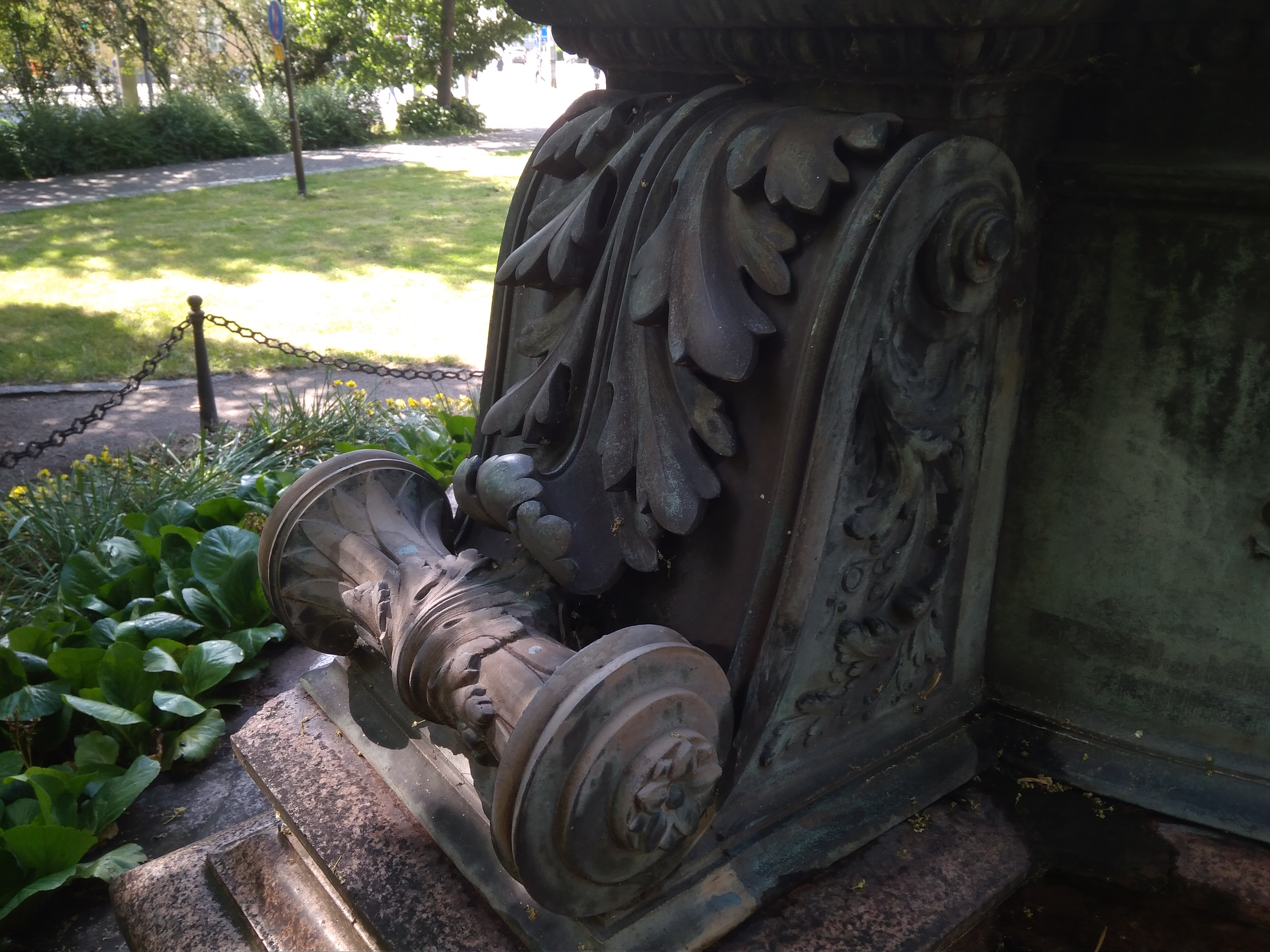
One of the volutes separating the inscriptions

The entire monument is 664 cm high, 269 cm of which belongs to the figure of Lanna. The pedestal of the statue is made of red granite imported from the Bayreuth area and was created by the stonemason Erhard Ackermann from Weissenstadt following the design of Franz Pönninger.[10]

=== Inscriptions ===
Above the granite pedestal sits a bronze pedestal with four text tablets separated by volutes. On the south (front) side is the inscription Adalbert Lanna. On the east and west sides there are in both cases four lines of text.

On the east side:

Freudig und rastlos schaffend
entrang Er dem Boden die Schätze
ebnet den Fluthen die Bahn
sie zu tragen ans Meer.

In English:
Joyfully and tirelessly he worked,
ripped the treasures of out of the earth,
straightened the flows of rivers
so that they would carry them to the sea.

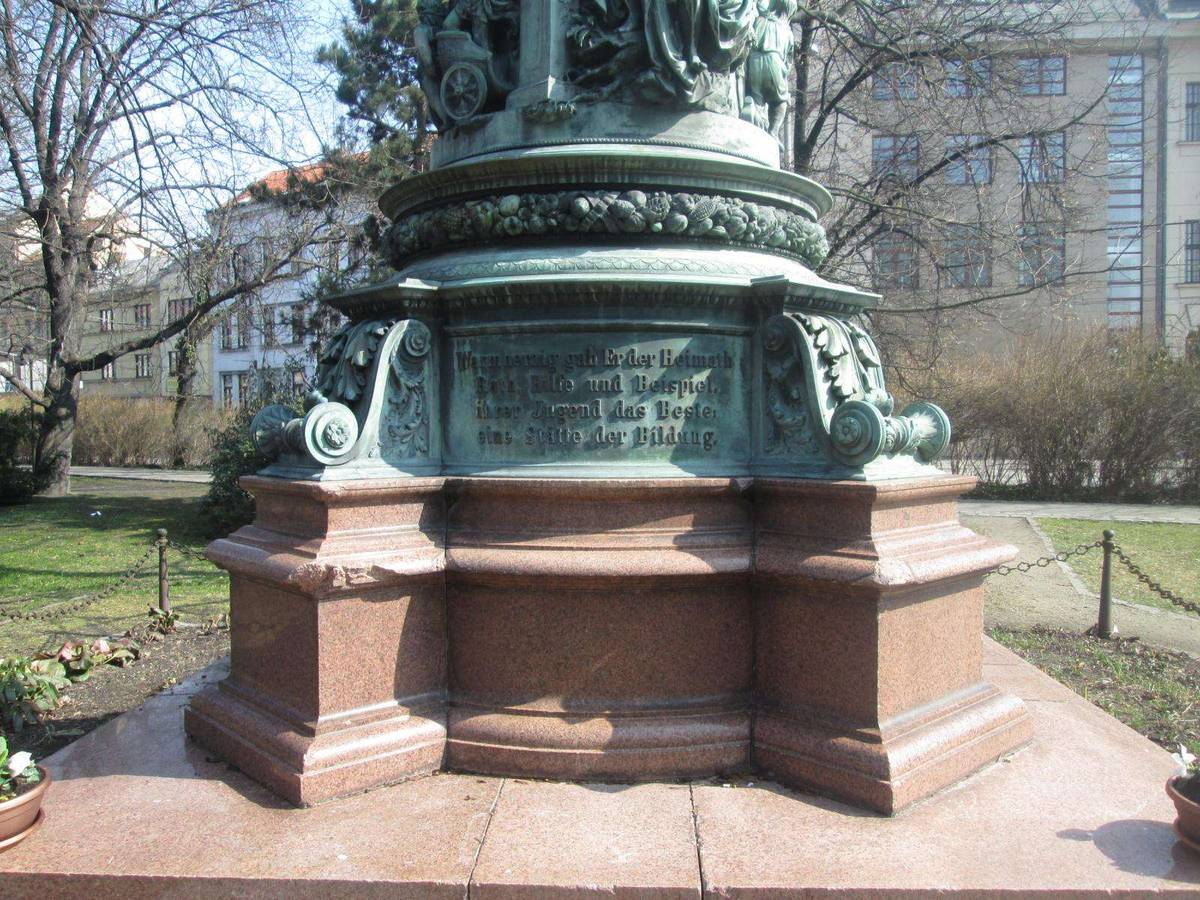
Detail of the west side of the pedestal

On the west side :

Warmherzig gab Er der Heimath
Rath, Hilfe und Beispiel,
ihrer Jugend das Beste:
eine Stätte der Bildung.

In English:
Kindheartedly he provided the homeland
with advice, help and example,
its youth [he provided] with the best:
a place of education.

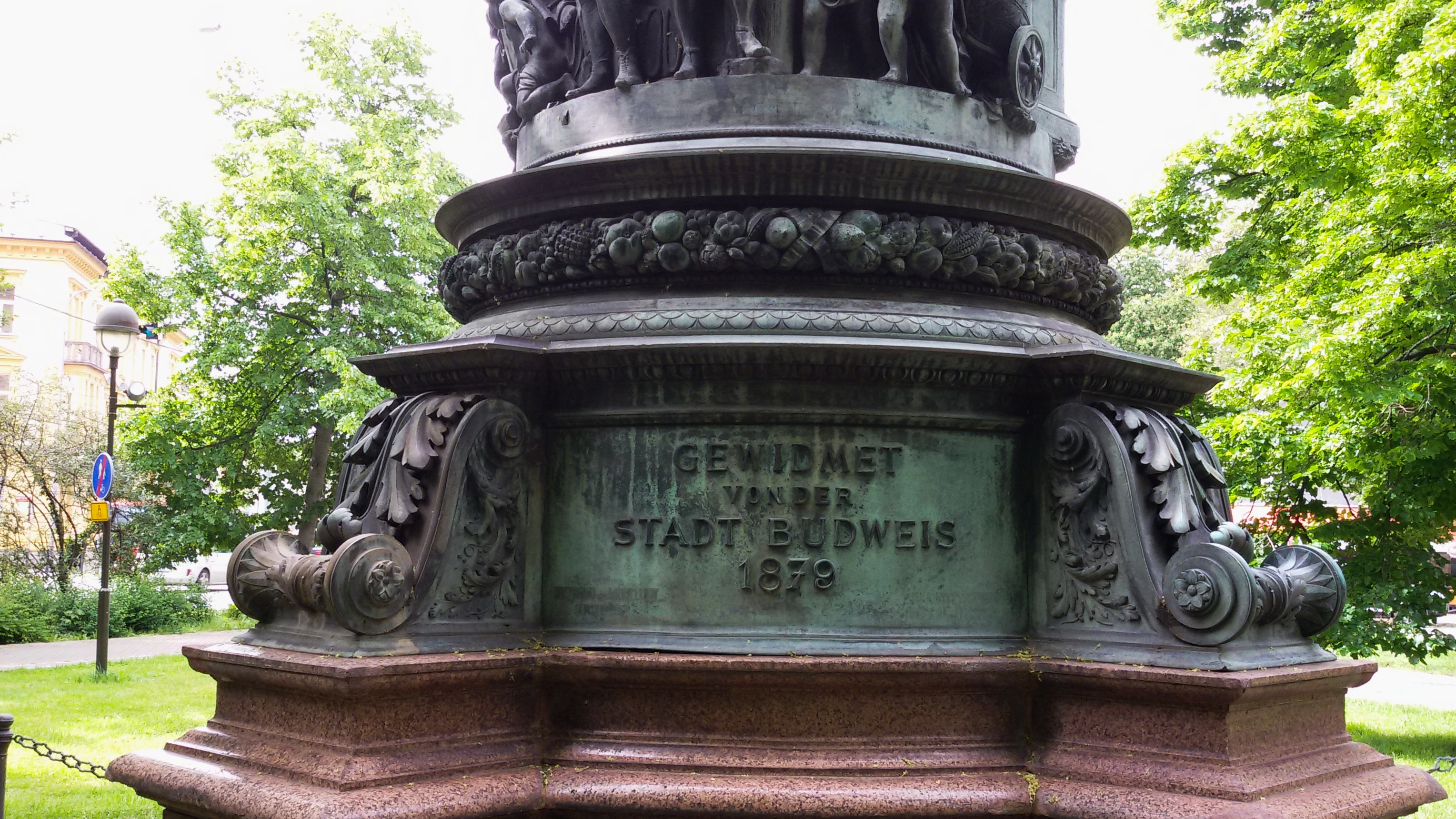
Back of the plinth

On the back of the monument, there is written in large letters:

Gewidmet
von der
Stadt Budweis
1879

In English:
Dedicated by the city of Budějovice 1879.

The entire monument is signed on the back in smaller, unobtrusive letters.

On the bottom left:

Erfunden und modelirt
F. Pönninger

In English:
Invented and shaped by F. Pönninger.

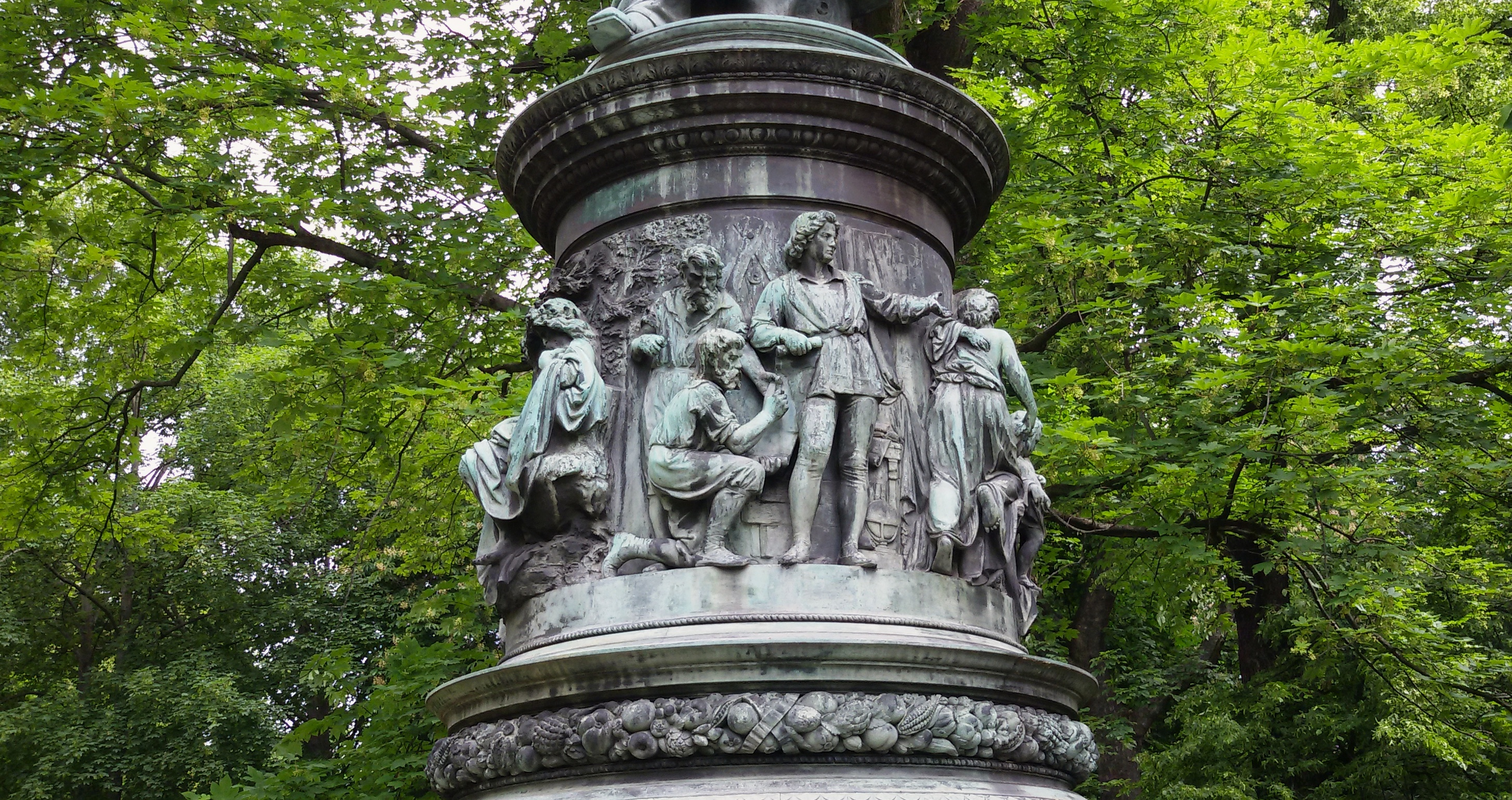
First relief scene

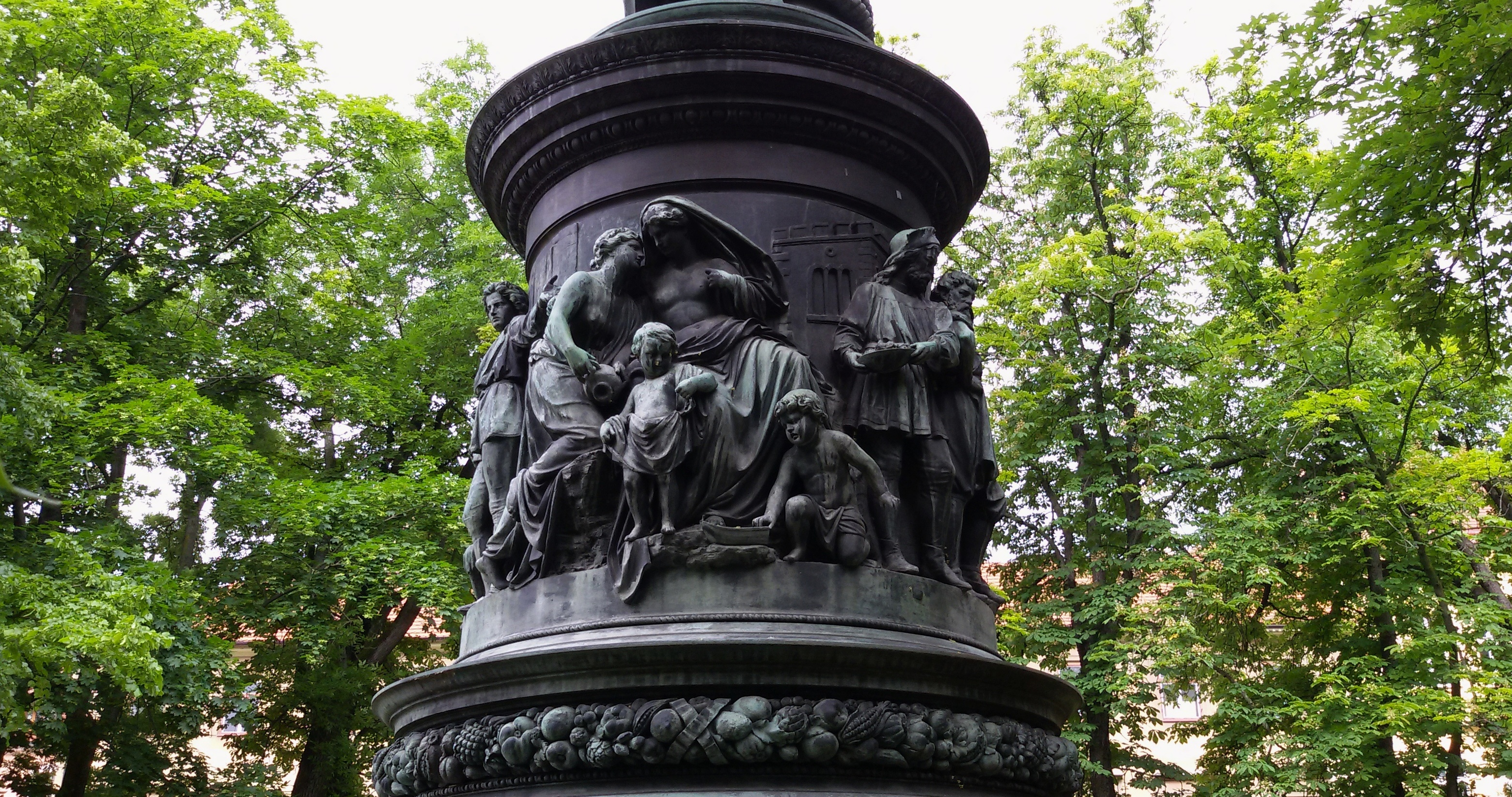
Second relief scene

On the bottom right:

K. k. Kunst Erzgiesserei
Rohlich und Ponninger Wien.

In English:
Imperial-royal artistic foundry Röhlich and Pönninger Vienna.

=== Reliefs on the cylinder ===
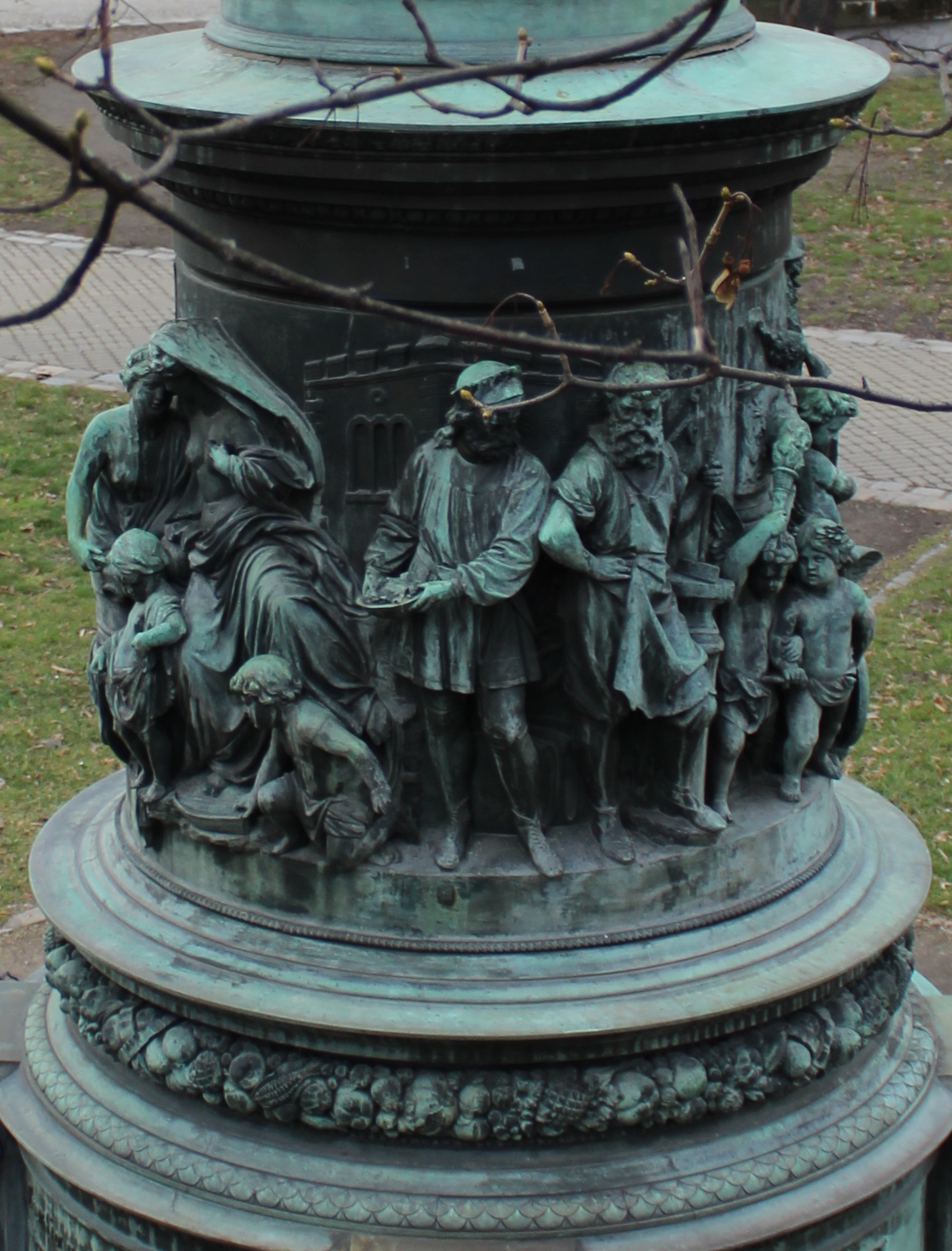
Third relief scene

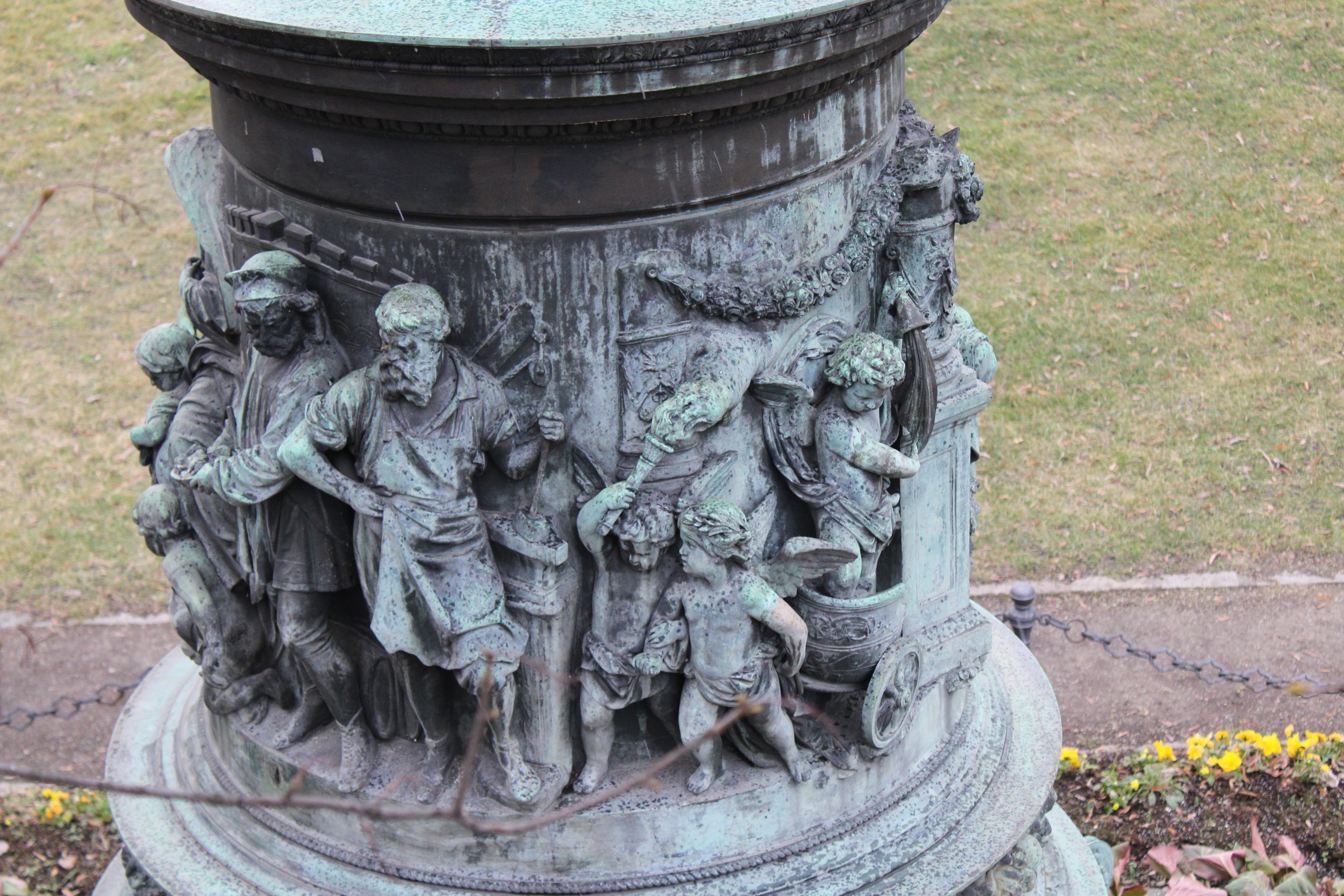
Fourth relief scene

The next level of the monument forms a cylinder decorated with reliefs. No official author's commentary on the meaning of the reliefs in their finished form has survived which leaves the reliefs fully open to interpretation. The scenes proceed from the front (southern) side towards the right side, the beginning and end of the cycle being defined by a strongly protruding column on the western side.

The first scene features the figure of the Old Man and the figure of the Young Man, who together form an antithesis. The kneeling assistant of the Young Man holds a compass and the standing assistant originally leaned on a vertical two-man lumberjack saw. This was not restored during the restoration of the monument in 1993. The Young Man is probably an idealized representation of Adalbert Lanna the Elder himself. This probably emphasizes the innovativeness, progressivity, and scientificity of Lanna's business activities as opposed to the old, repeated tradition of doing things the way they had been done since ancient times.

The second scene depicts two female figures dressed in flowing draperies and two children in front of them. The female figures are allegorical representations of the confluence of two rivers that played a major role in the business activities of Adalbert Lanna the Elder - the bare-headed Vltava river leans towards the more powerful Elbe river. The meaning of the two boy figures is not clear at all; the wooden boat is probably a reference to the hundreds of river boats that were manufactured in the Lanna shipyard in České Budějovice and that transported Lanna's goods along both rivers (the Vltava and the Elbe) all the way to Hamburg. It is possible to assume that the relief was again not restored to its original state. The amphora of the allegorical Vltava probably also had "water flowing out" before, and the boy on the left could have pulled the boat by a string held with his raised left hand.

In the third scene, two male figures stand side by side. The man on the left holds a bowl, has a measuring stick at his waist, and there are stacked barrels at his feet in the background. This is probably a personification of Trade. The man on the right, in a work apron, leans on a hammer and anvil, and there is a pulley and gears visible in the background. He is therefore probably a personification of Industry. Both personifications refer generally to the two main branches of Lanna's activity, but perhaps also directly to the České Budějovice Chamber of Commerce and Industry, which Lanna co-founded in 1851 after returning from his visit to the first World Exhibition in London.

In the last scene, two putti pull a third one, who is riding in a chariot passing through a festive gate. The putti with a wreath in its hair has its left arm attached with a staple, which is probably again the result of a rough repair in 1993. Similarly, in the case of the putti riding in a chariot, there are doubts whether the position of its right arm is original or not. The whole scene is perhaps a combination of the traditional iconographic type of the posthumous apotheosis of the main character (an antique chariot passing under a festoon into a blooming Elysium) and the newly emerging iconographic type of the allegory of the railway (a heavily smoking torch carried in front and a putti pouring out a cornucopia along the way - a symbol of the economic prosperity that the railway is supposed to bring).

=== Sculptural portrait ===
The statue of Adalbert Lanna the Elder stands at the very top of the monument and looks down at the viewer. With his left hand he holds the drapery, which partially covers his mundane civilian clothing. A pier post wrapped in a rope stands by Lanna's left foot - an attribute derived from his title of an Imperial-royal shipmaster.

== Possible artistic predecessors and related works ==
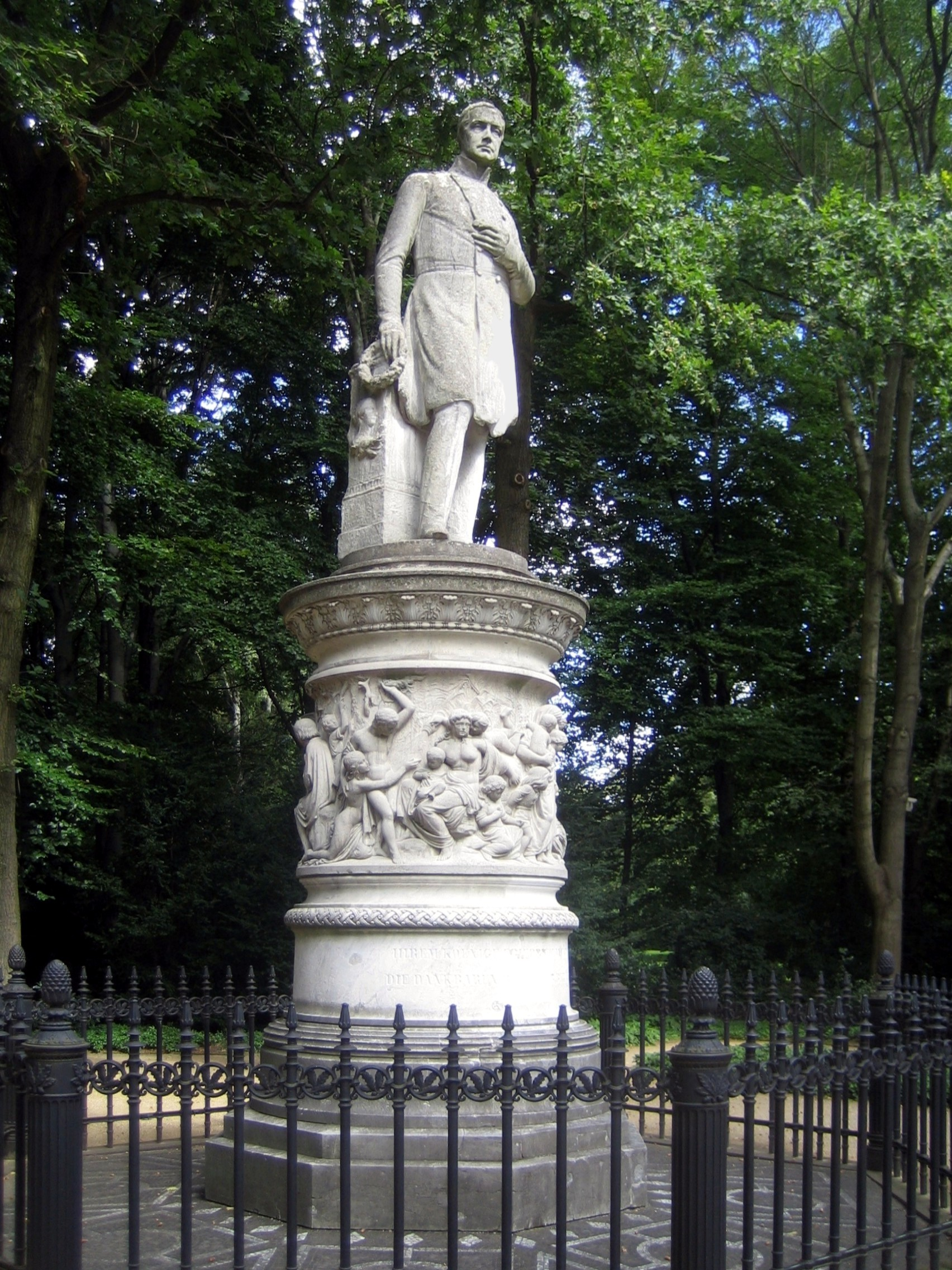
Friedrich William III monument in Berlin's Tiergarten by Friedrich Drake (1849)

Franz Pönninger could have been inspired by, for example, the monument to Friedrich William III in Berlin's Tiergarten finished in 1849 by Friedrich Drake or even by older monuments in London - the monument to Admiral Horatio Nelson from 1818 by John Flaxman or the monument to King William IV of England at the intersection of King William Street and Cannon Street that was unveiled in 1844. Pönninger was able to see all of these monuments in person during his trip abroad in 1862.

Formally related contemporary works include, for example, the monument to Archduke Maximilian in Trieste by Johannes Schilling, the Edinburgh monument to John Platt by D. W. Stevenson, the Genoa monument to the doctor David Chiossone by Santo Saccomanno, or the Bremen war memorial by Karl Keil. From a slightly later time there are two monuments in the Tiergarten in Berlin that display similarities - the monument to Johann Wolfgang Göthe by Fritz Schaper and the monument to the Prussian Queen Luisa of Mecklenburg-Strelitz by Erdmann Encke. In the rest of Bohemia, the monument to Karel Havlíček in Kutná Hora by Josef Strachovský (unveiled in 1883, four years after the Lanna monument) is striking in its similarity.

Among the works of art created by Franz Pönninger, the České Budějovice monument to Adalbert Lanna the Elder belongs to the most significant commissions he worked on, and can be compared to his other two grandiose monuments completed only slightly earlier - the monument to the mayor of Vienna, Ondřej Zelinka, in Vienna's City Park, and the fountain monument to Archduke Johann standing on the main square of Graz.
