= Boršov nad Vltavou =

- Municipality
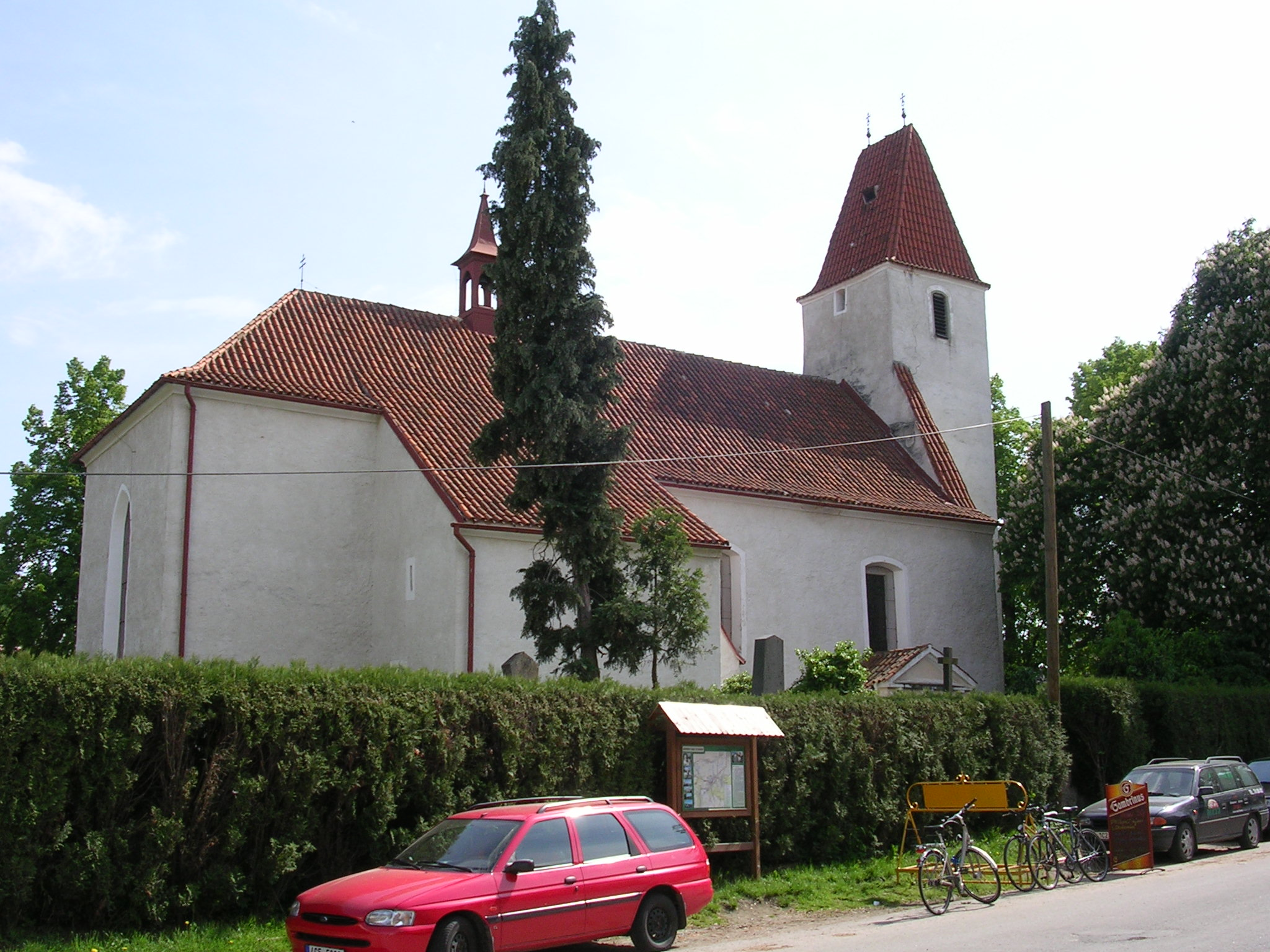
- Church of Saint James the Great

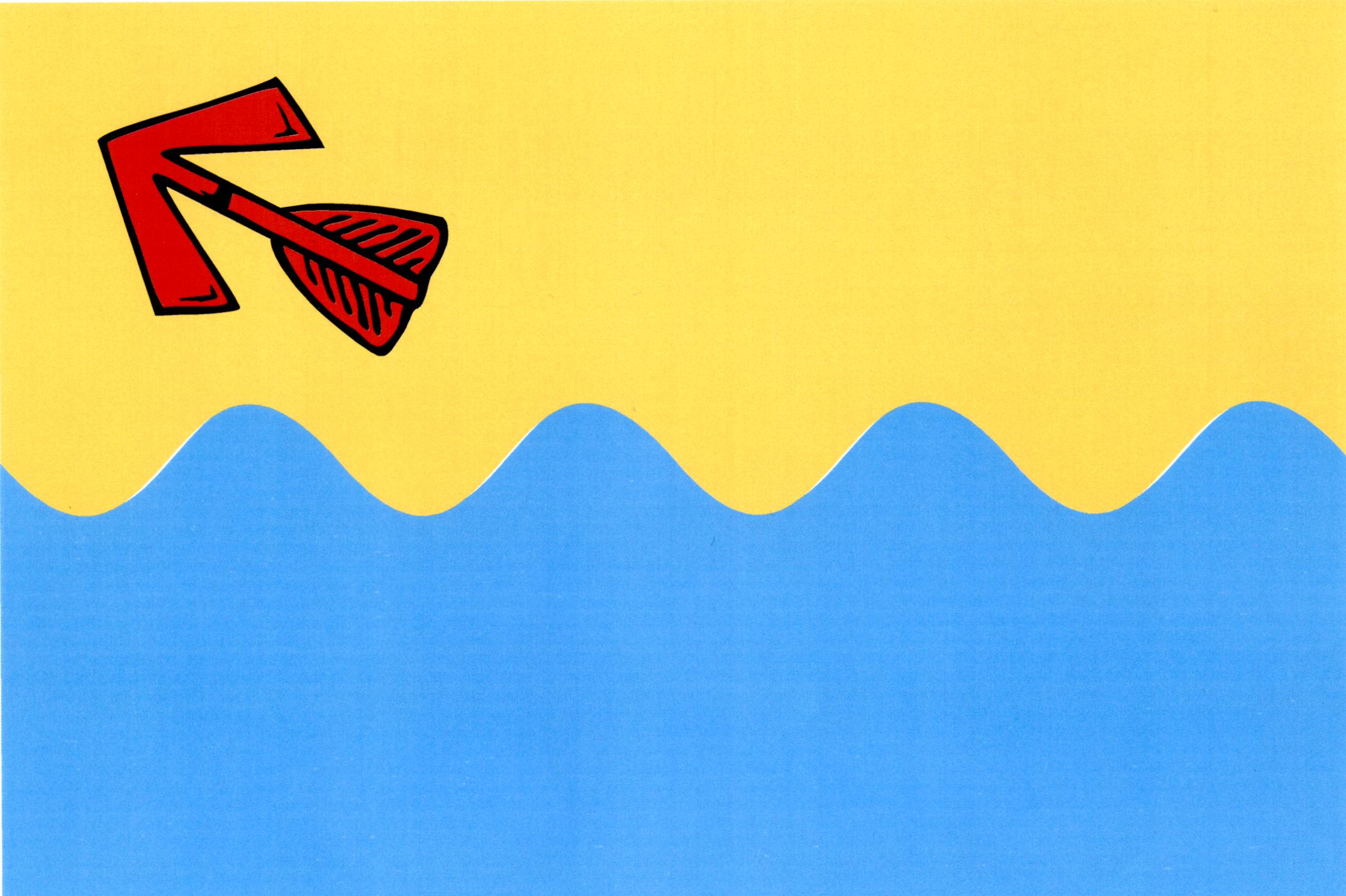
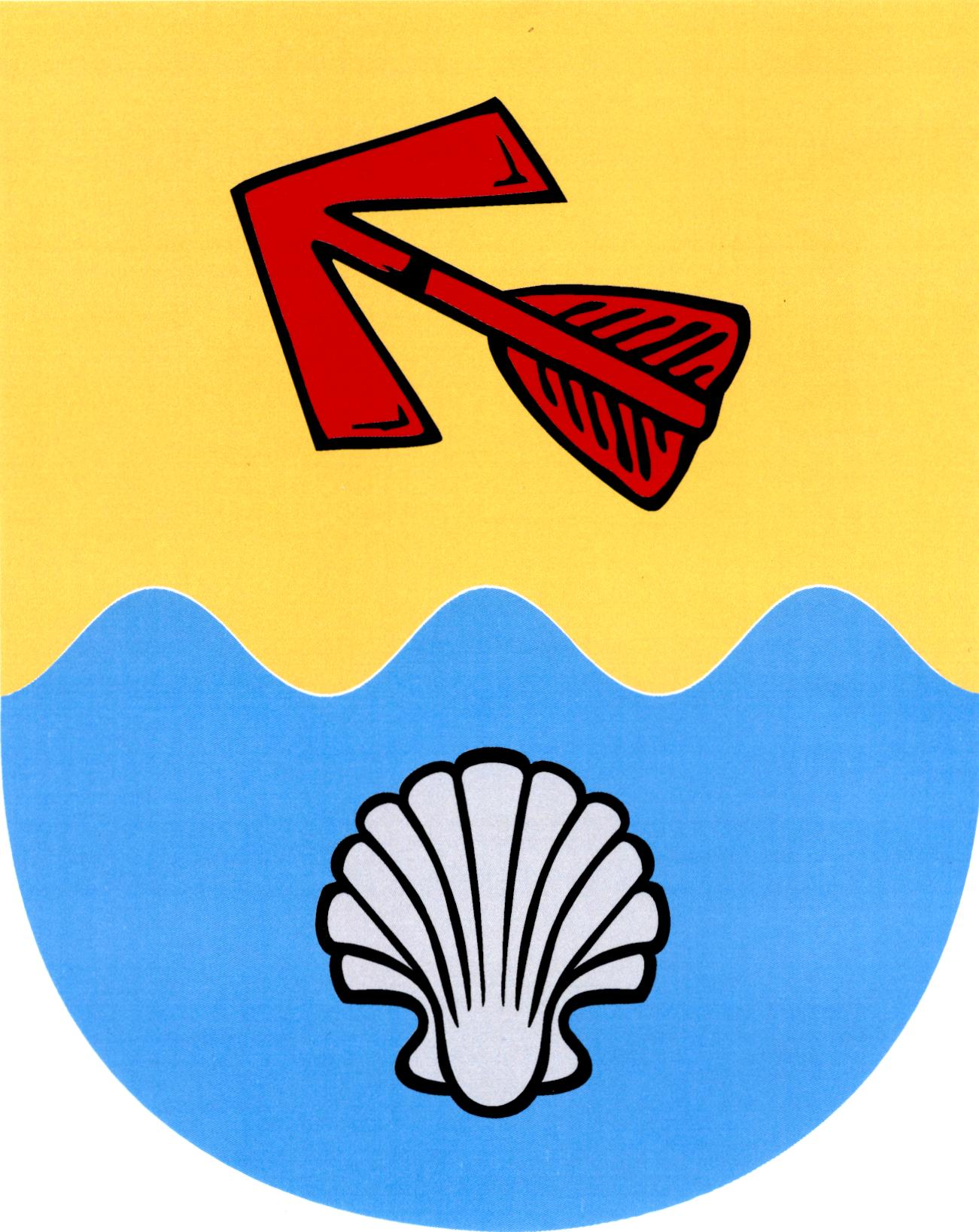
- Flag Coat of arms

- Location in the Czech Republic
- Coordinates: 48°55′19″N 14°26′2″E
- Country: Czech Republic
- Region: South Bohemian
- District: České Budějovice
- First mentioned: 1261

Area
  - Total: 9.96 km^{2} (3.85 sq mi)
- Elevation: 413 m (1,355 ft)

Population (2026-01-01)
  - Total: 2,143
  - Density: 215/km^{2} (557/sq mi)
- Time zone: UTC+1 (CET)
  - Summer (DST): UTC+2 (CEST)
- Postal code: 373 82
- Website: www.borsovnvlt.cz

Boršov nad Vltavou (until 1950 Boršov; German: Payreschau) is a municipality and village in České Budějovice District in the South Bohemian Region of the Czech Republic. It has about 2,100 inhabitants. The municipality is located on the Vltava River.

== Administrative division ==
Boršov nad Vltavou consists of four municipal parts (in brackets population according to the 2021 census):

- Boršov nad Vltavou (959)
- Jamné (53)
- Poříčí (903)
- Zahorčice (127)

== Etymology ==
The name Boršov is derived from the personal name Boreš, meaning "Boreš's (court)".

== Geography ==
Boršov nad Vltavou is located about 4 kilometres (2 mi) southwest of České Budějovice. It lies on the border between the České Budějovice Basin and Gratzen Foothills. The highest point is at 510 m (1,673 ft) above sea level. The Vltava River flows through the municipality. The municipal territory is rich in fishponds.

== History ==
The first written mention of Boršov is from 1261.

Until 1950, Boršov and Poříčí were two separate municipalities. In 1950, the municipalities merged and the name was changed to Boršov nad Vltavou.

== Demographics ==
Historical population

Year	Pop.	±%
1869	723	—
1880	774	+7.1%
1890	864	+11.6%
1900	886	+2.5%
1910	952	+7.4%

Year	Pop.	±%
1921	920	−3.4%
1930	963	+4.7%
1950	952	−1.1%
1961	1,135	+19.2%
1970	1,054	−7.1%

Year	Pop.	±%
1980	995	−5.6%
1991	894	−10.2%
2001	918	+2.7%
2011	1,754	+91.1%
2021	2,042	+16.4%

Source: Censuses

== Transport ==
The I/3 road (part of the European route E55), specifically the section from České Budějovice to the Czech–Austrian border in Dolní Dvořiště, runs through the municipality.

Boršov nad Vltavou is located on the railway line České Budějovice–Volary.

== Sights ==
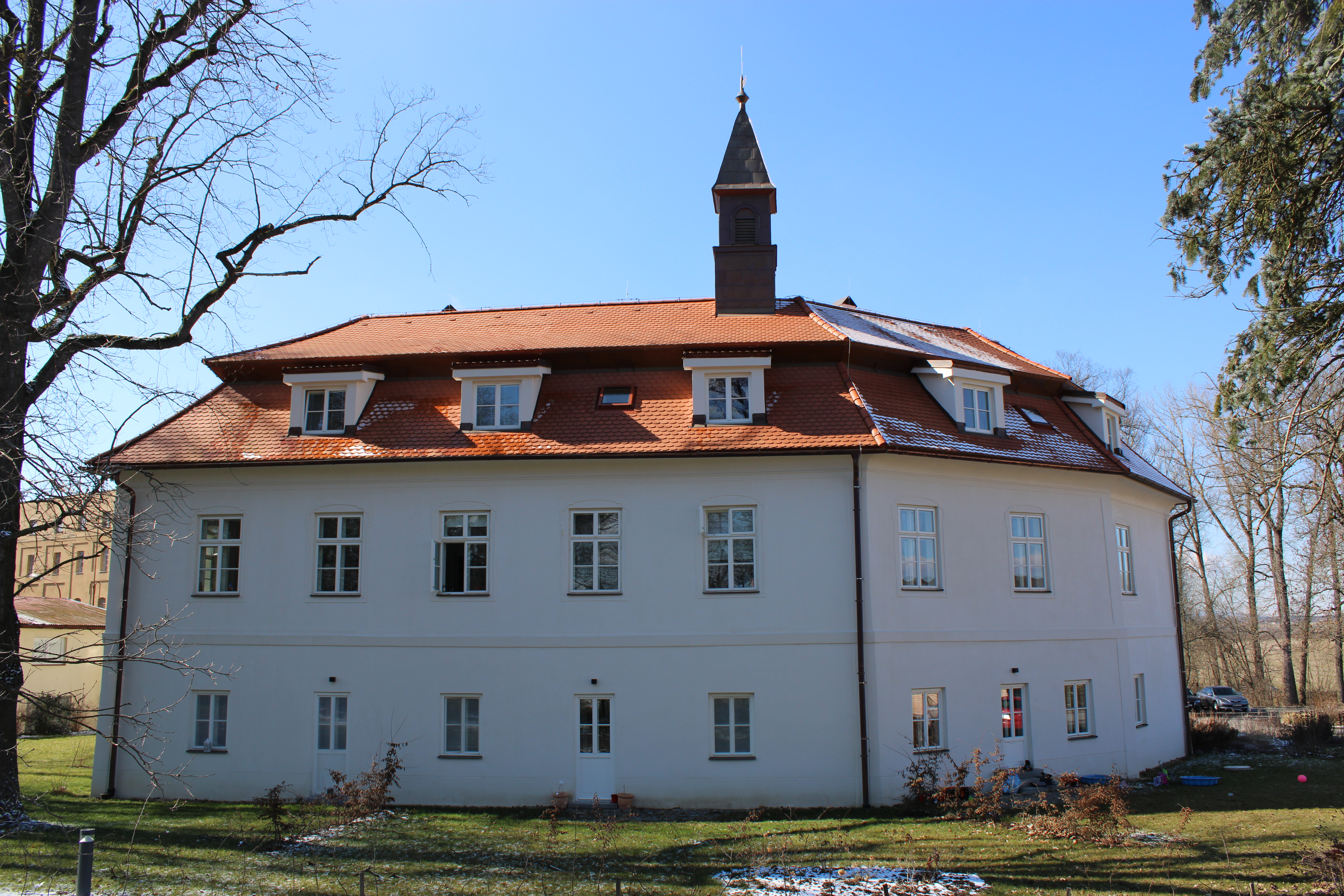
Poříčí Castle

The main landmark of Boršov nad Vltavou is the Church of Saint James the Great. It is originally a Gothic church, which was rebuilt several times. The first significant reconstruction took place in the years 1493–1496, when the tower was also added. Further modifications were gradually implemented during the 18th–20th centuries. In the interior there are valuable wall paintings of St. Christopher from the 16th century.

The Poříčí Castle is located in Poříčí. It was originally a fortress, first documented in 1562, rebuilt in the Renaissance and Baroque styles. Today it is privately owned. After the reconstruction, it was converted into apartments. Next to the castle is a small English park, founded by the then-owner of the castle Adalbert Lanna the Elder between 1840 and 1854. It is accessible to the public.

A Glagolitic script themed park was built in 2013 on the site of a former landfill, to commemorate the 1150th anniversary of the invention of the script, with stone thrones bearing the inscriptions 'prince' and 'princess' as its centrepieces.

The Parish Garden (Czech: Farská zahrada) is home to a plum planted in 1937 in honour of Czechoslovak politician Gustav Habrman, and as of 2013 features an outdoor gym.
