= Libníč =

- Municipality
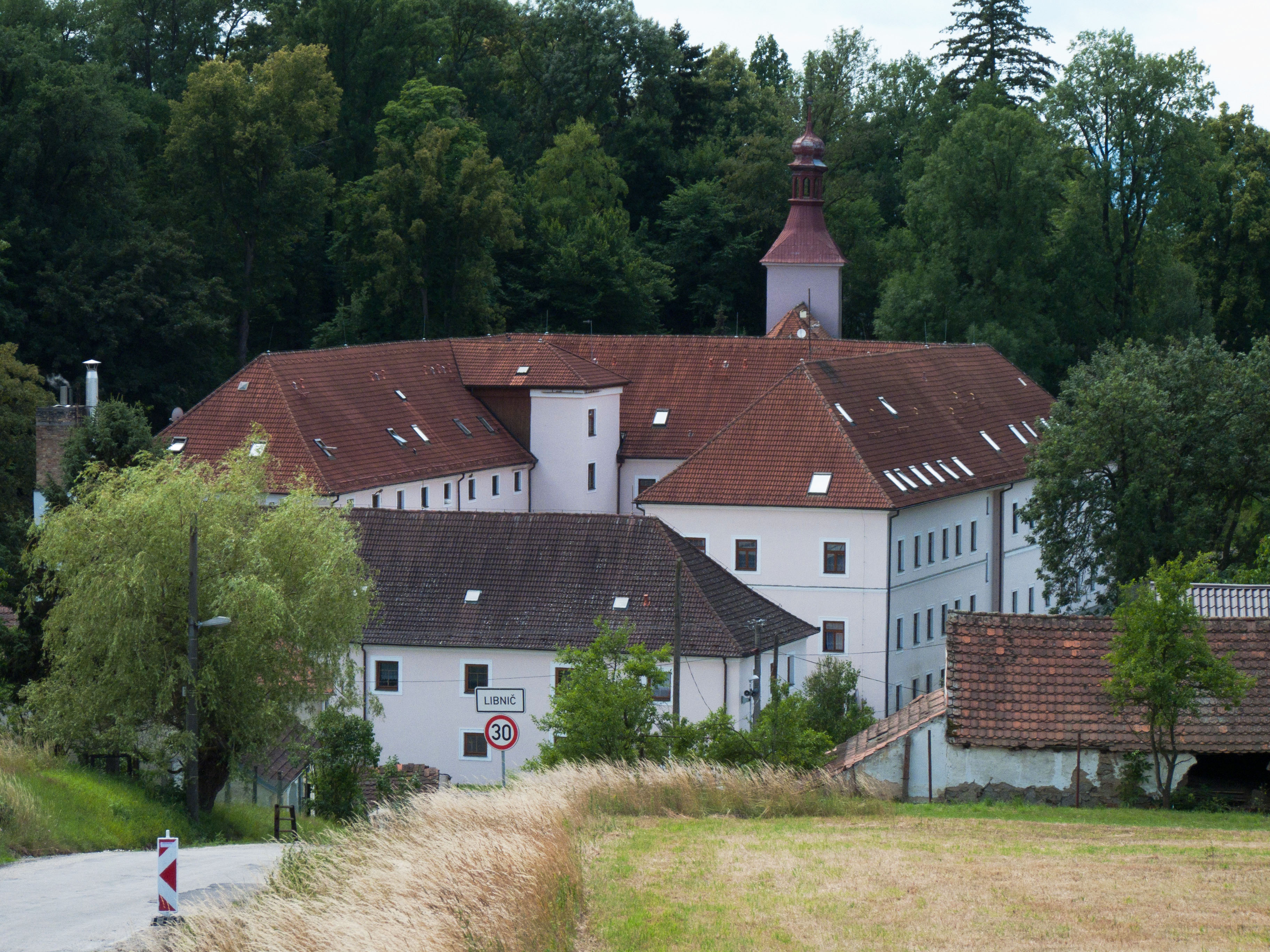
- Former spa

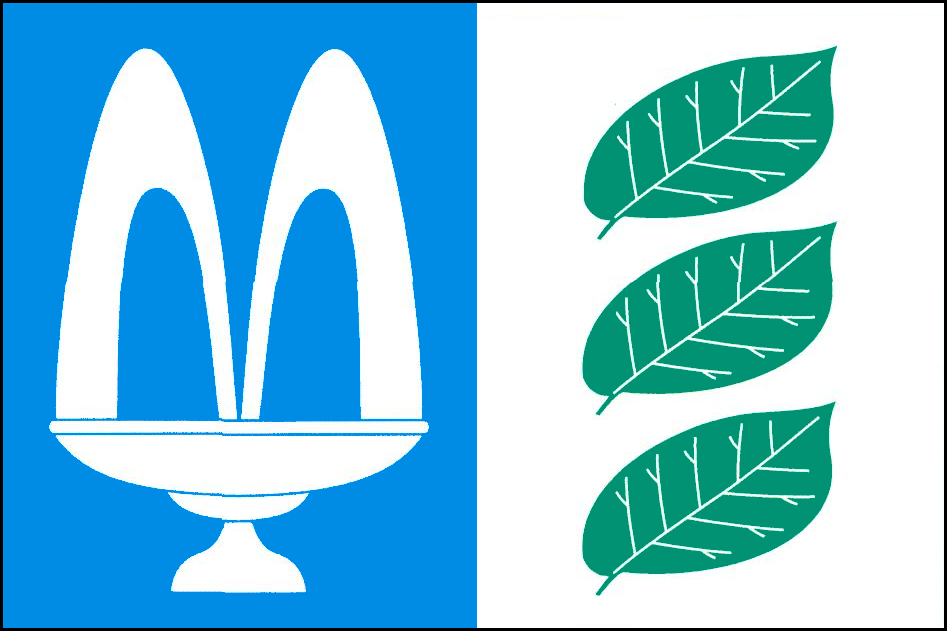
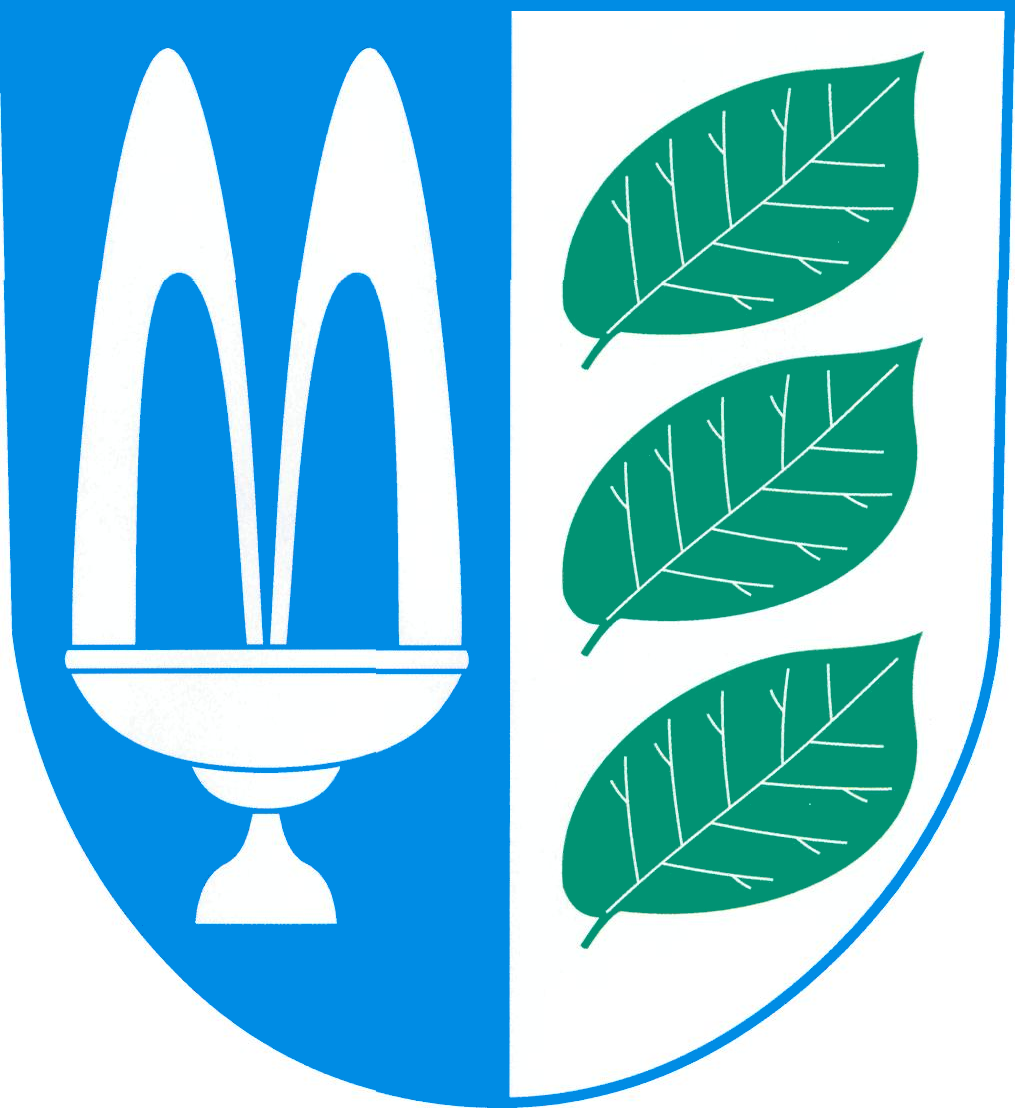
- Flag Coat of arms

- Location in the Czech Republic
- Coordinates: 49°1′11″N 14°32′37″E
- Country: Czech Republic
- Region: South Bohemian
- District: České Budějovice
- First mentioned: 1394

Area
  - Total: 6.85 km^{2} (2.64 sq mi)
- Elevation: 468 m (1,535 ft)

Population (2026-01-01)
  - Total: 599
  - Density: 87.4/km^{2} (226/sq mi)
- Time zone: UTC+1 (CET)
  - Summer (DST): UTC+2 (CEST)
- Postal code: 373 71
- Website: www.libnic.cz

Libníč is a municipality and village in České Budějovice District in the South Bohemian Region of the Czech Republic. It has about 600 inhabitants.

== Administrative division ==
Libníč consists of two municipal parts (in brackets population according to the 2021 census):

- Libníč (532)
- Jelmo (90)

== Etymology ==
The initial name of the village was Libníče. The name was derived from the personal name Libník, meaning "Libník's (village)".

== Geography ==
Libníč is located about 6 km (4 mi) northeast of České Budějovice. It lies in the Třeboň Basin. The highest point is the hill Čakov at 554 m (1,818 ft) above sea level.

== History ==
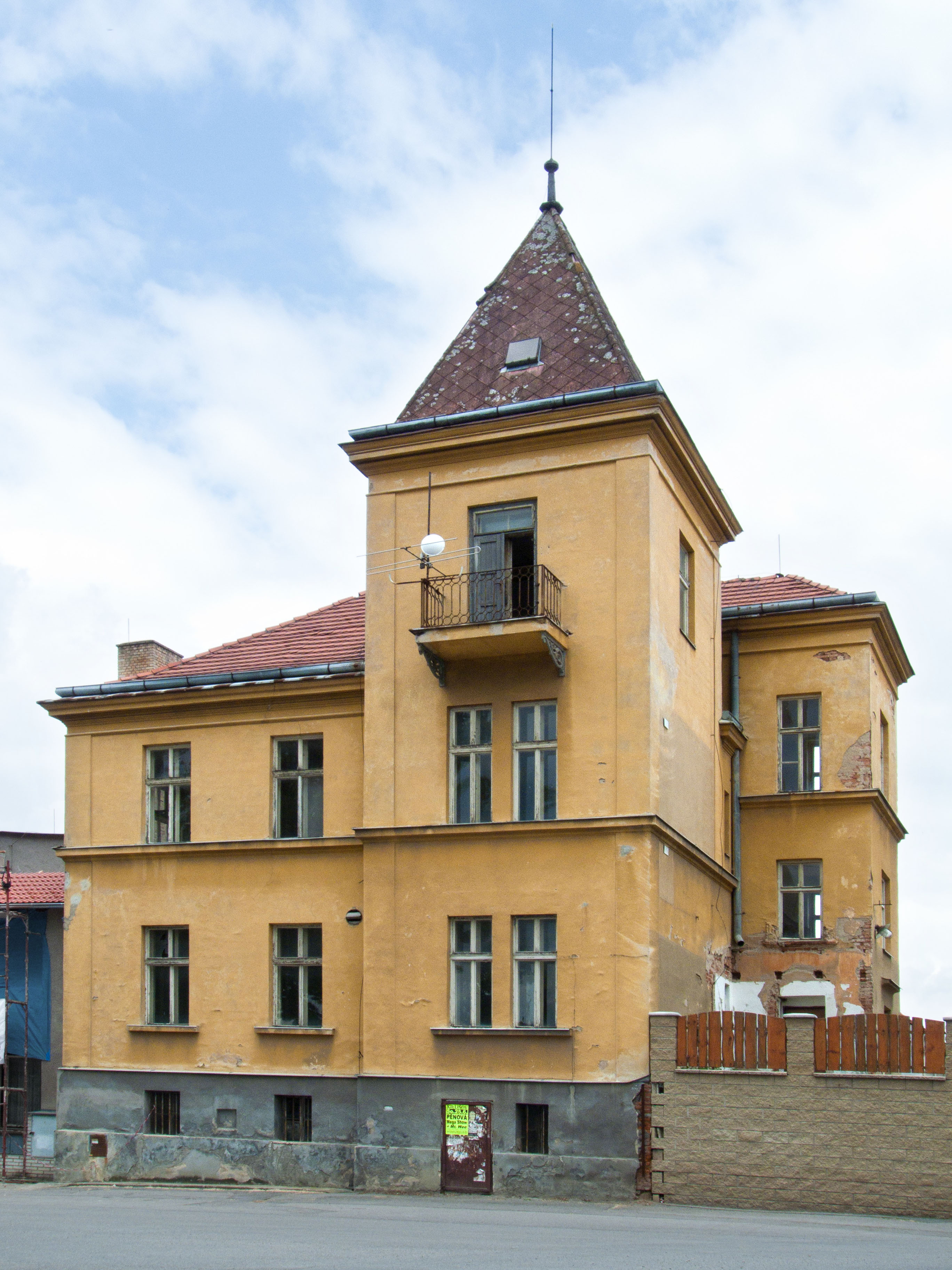
Bezdíček's Villa, today the municipal office

The first written mention of Libníč is from 1394. The next mention is from 1490, when it was part of the Hluboká estate owned by the Pernštejn family. From 1571 to 1801, silver was mined in several local adits, but after the peak in the 1580s, the mining slowly declined.

In 1681, the healing effects of the local spring of sulphite-iron water were discovered, and so in 1714 the construction of spa buildings began. The operation of the spa continued for 200 years until the spring died out, which was attributed to mining activities. Libníč became an independent municipality in 1785 under the name Libnič.

In the middle of the 19th century, the spa gradually began to decline, but Libnič remained a popular resort and several villas were built there. In 1923, the municipality changed its name from Libnič to Libníč. From 1976 to 1990, Libníč was merged with Rudolfov.

== Demographics ==
Historical population

Year	Pop.	±%
1869	579	—
1880	587	+1.4%
1890	511	−12.9%
1900	458	−10.4%
1910	486	+6.1%

Year	Pop.	±%
1921	479	−1.4%
1930	366	−23.6%
1950	454	+24.0%
1961	405	−10.8%
1970	405	+0.0%

Year	Pop.	±%
1980	394	−2.7%
1991	342	−13.2%
2001	377	+10.2%
2011	489	+29.7%
2021	622	+27.2%

Source: Censuses

== Economy ==
In 2010, a photovoltaic power station was put into operation in the municipality.

== Transport ==
The D3 motorway (part of the European route E55) from Prague to České Budějovice briefly passes through the western part of the municipality.

== Sights ==
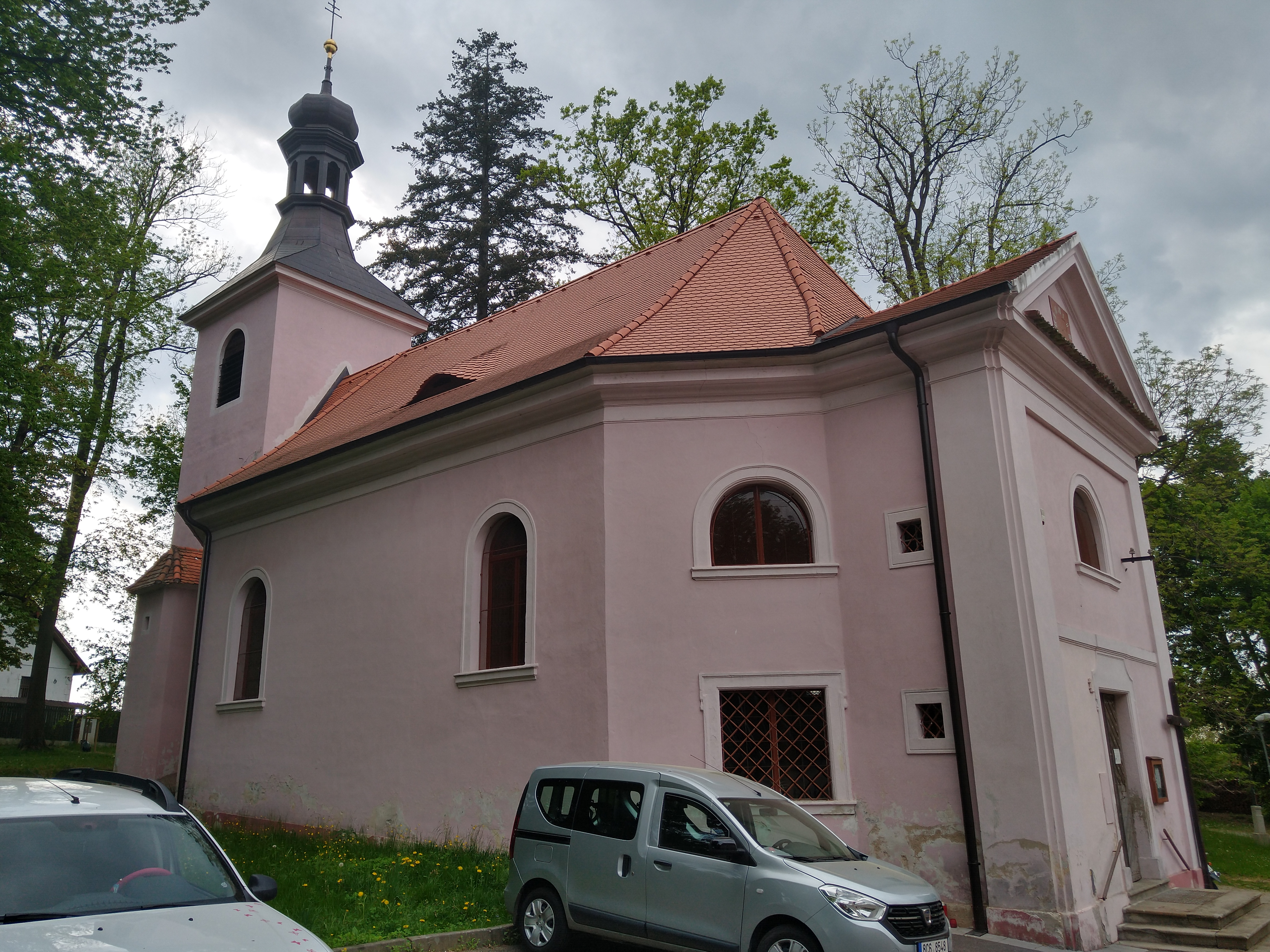
Church of the Holy Trinity

In 1715, a Baroque castle and a chapel were built. The castle was extended and rebuilt into a spa building in 1770. In 1952, it was rebuilt into a retirement home. The chapel was rebuilt into the Church of the Holy Trinity in 1788, which has been a parish church since 1855.

Architecturally valuable are the villas built in the late 19th century. The main landmark of the centre of Libníč is Bezdíček's Villa, today used as the municipal office and a pub.
