= Želnava =

- Municipality
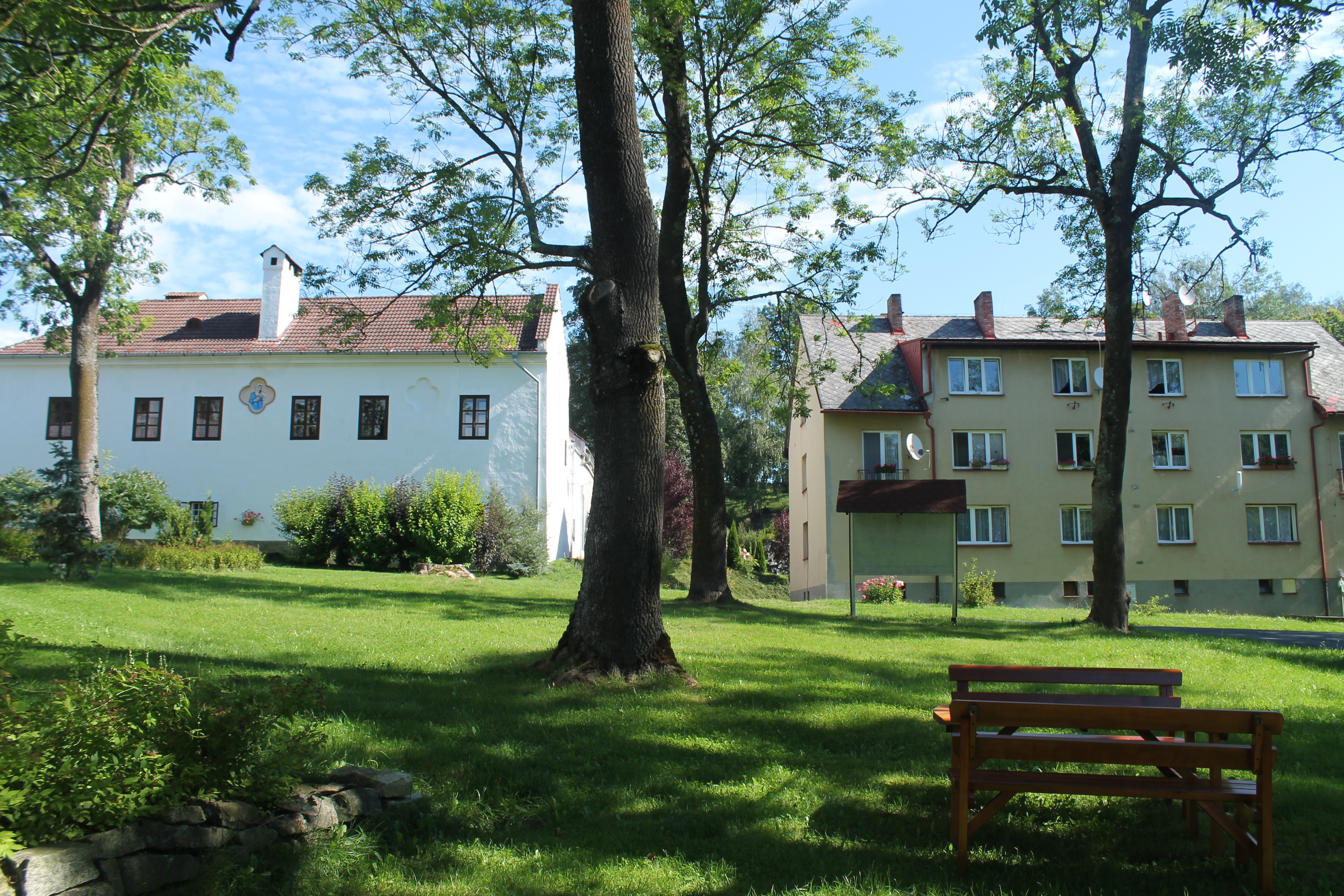
- Centre of Želnava

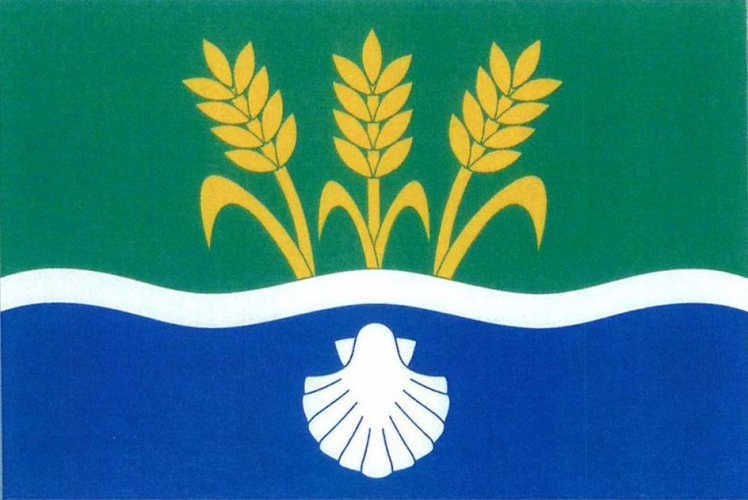
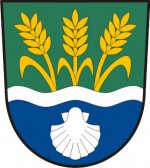
- Flag Coat of arms

- Location in the Czech Republic
- Coordinates: 48°48′44″N 13°57′54″E
- Country: Czech Republic
- Region: South Bohemian
- District: Prachatice
- First mentioned: 1360

Area
  - Total: 10.41 km^{2} (4.02 sq mi)
- Elevation: 775 m (2,543 ft)

Population (2026-01-01)
  - Total: 128
  - Density: 12.3/km^{2} (31.8/sq mi)
- Time zone: UTC+1 (CET)
  - Summer (DST): UTC+2 (CEST)
- Postal code: 384 51
- Website: www.zelnava.cz

Želnava (German: Salnau) is a municipality and village in Prachatice District in the South Bohemian Region of the Czech Republic. It has about 100 inhabitants.

== Administrative division ==
Želnava consists of three municipal parts (in brackets population according to the 2021 census):

- Želnava (102)
- Slunečná (7)
- Záhvozdí (16)

== Etymology ==
The initial German name of Želnava was probably Seldenau. That would mean that it was derived from the older German words Selde ('hut', 'cottage') and Au ('floodplain', 'meadow').

== Geography ==
Želnava is located about 22 kilometres (14 mi) south of Prachatice and 41 km (25 mi) southwest of České Budějovice. It lies in the Bohemian Forest mountain range, on the border between the Šumava National Park and Šumava Protected Landscape Area. The highest point is at 850 m (2,789 ft) above sea level. The upper course of the Vltava River flows along the western municipal border.

== History ==
The first written mention of Želnava is from 1360. Until the beginning of the 16th century, it belonged to the Zlatá Koruna estate. After that, the village was owned by the Rosenberg family.

Until World War II, Želnava had an ethnic German majority. After World War II, the German-speaking inhabitants were expelled.

== Demographics ==
Historical population

Year	Pop.	±%
1869	750	—
1880	892	+18.9%
1890	821	−8.0%
1900	829	+1.0%
1910	842	+1.6%

Year	Pop.	±%
1921	901	+7.0%
1930	843	−6.4%
1950	189	−77.6%
1961	184	−2.6%
1970	226	+22.8%

Year	Pop.	±%
1980	153	−32.3%
1991	152	−0.7%
2001	131	−13.8%
2011	109	−16.8%
2021	125	+14.7%

Source: Censuses

== Transport ==
The I/39 road (the section from Český Krumlov to Volary) runs through the municipality.

== Sights ==
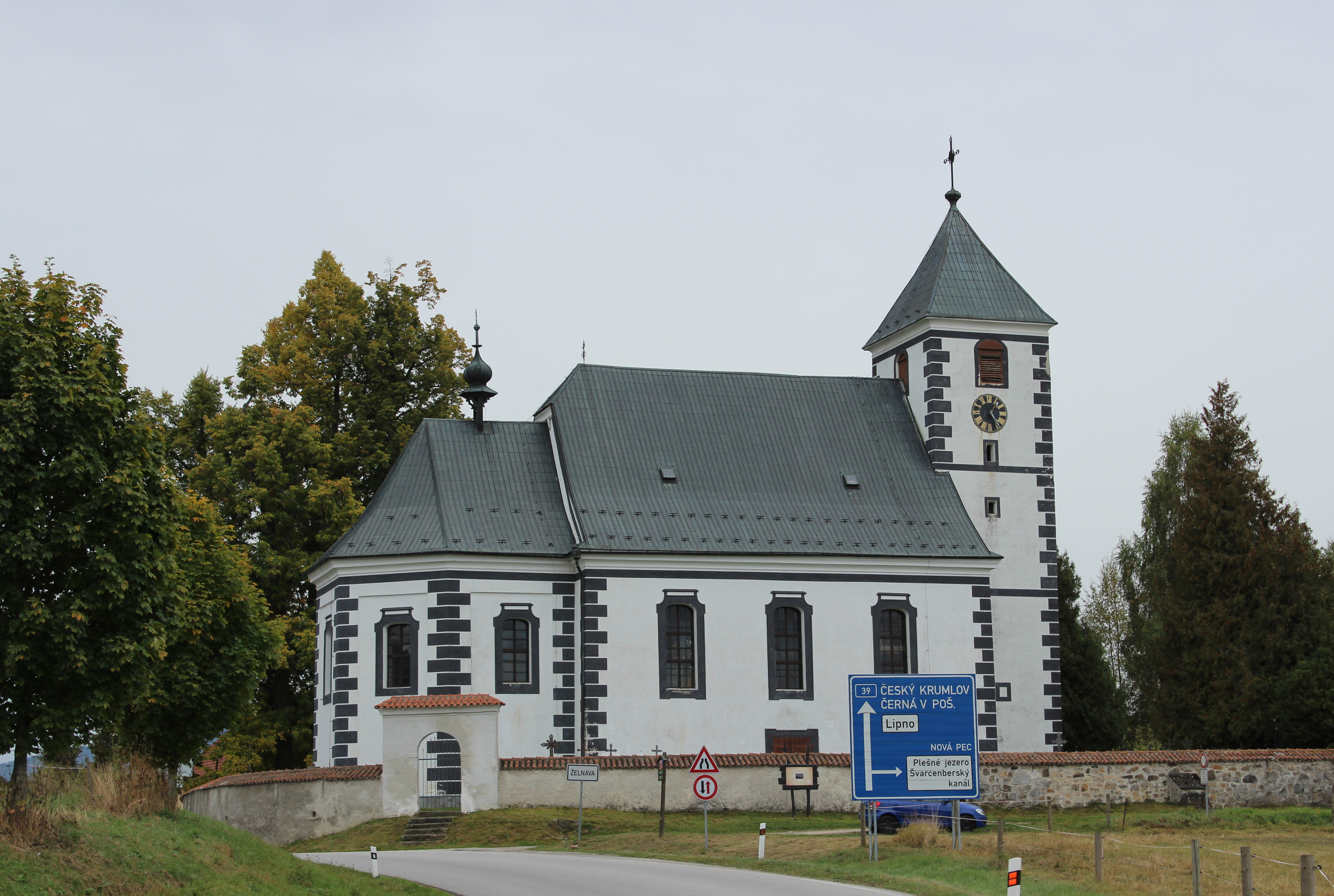
Church of Saint James the Great

The main landmark of Želnava is the Church of Saint James the Great. The first mention of the church is from 1395. In 1708–1712, it was completely rebuilt to its present form. From the medieval church, probably only the lower part of the tower has survived.

A technical monument is a stone water reservoir in the centre of Želnava. It dates from 1818.
