= Nučice (Prague-West District) =

- Municipality
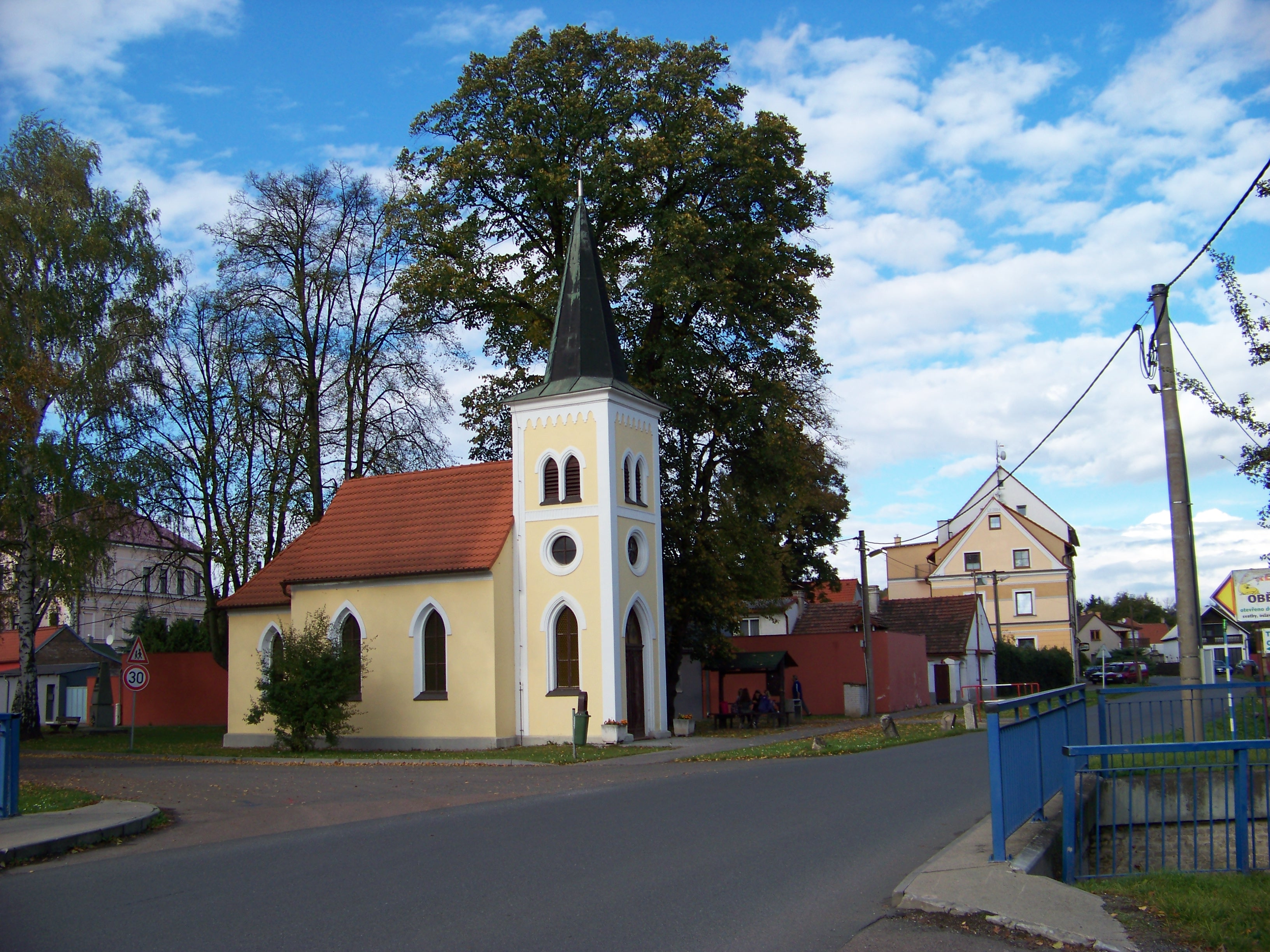
- Chapel of Saint Procopius

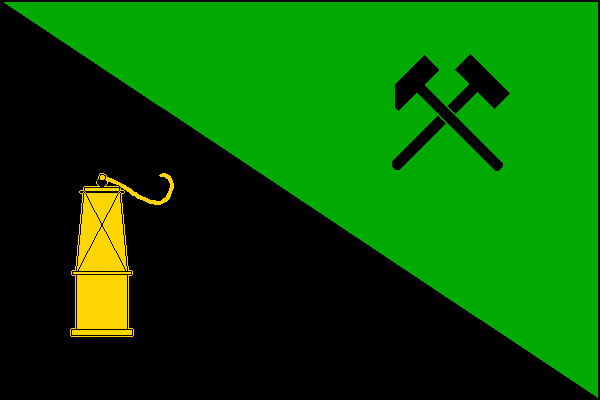
- Flag Coat of arms

- Location in the Czech Republic
- Coordinates: 50°1′7″N 14°13′48″E
- Country: Czech Republic
- Region: Central Bohemian
- District: Prague-West
- First mentioned: 1037

Area
  - Total: 5.95 km^{2} (2.30 sq mi)
- Elevation: 344 m (1,129 ft)

Population (2026-01-01)
  - Total: 2,494
  - Density: 419/km^{2} (1,090/sq mi)
- Time zone: UTC+1 (CET)
  - Summer (DST): UTC+2 (CEST)
- Postal code: 252 16
- Website: www.nucice.eu

Nučice is a municipality and village in Prague-West District in the Central Bohemian Region of the Czech Republic. It has about 2,500 inhabitants.

== Etymology ==
The initial name of the village was Vnučice. It was derived from the personal name Vnuk, meaning "the village of Vnuk's people".

== Geography ==
Nučice is located about 7 kilometres (4 mi) west of Prague. Most of the municipal territory, including the Nučice village, lies in a flat agricultural landscape in the Prague Plateau. The southwestern part extends into the Hořovice Uplands and the northwestern part extends into the Křivoklát Highlands. The highest point is at 424 m (1,391 ft) above sea level.

== History ==
The first written mention of Nučice is from 1037. In 1295, King Wenceslaus II donated the village to the Metropolitan Chapter at Saint Vitus in Prague. Nučice was the site of a fortress, which was destroyed during the Hussite Wars. After the Hussite Wars, Nučice was acquired by the Lords of Kladno. They owned the village until 1540. After 1580, Nučice was annexed to the Červený Újezd estate.

In 1845, iron ore began to be mined near Nučice. At the end of the 19th century and the beginning of the 20th century, mining developed and caused the growth of the village and an influx of new residents.

== Demographics ==
Historical population

| Year | Pop. | ±% |
|---|---|---|
| 1869 | 438 | — |
| 1880 | 478 | +9.1% |
| 1890 | 694 | +45.2% |
| 1900 | 1,205 | +73.6% |
| 1910 | 1,438 | +19.3% |

| Year | Pop. | ±% |
|---|---|---|
| 1921 | 1,388 | −3.5% |
| 1930 | 1,455 | +4.8% |
| 1950 | 1,139 | −21.7% |
| 1961 | 1,186 | +4.1% |
| 1970 | 1,080 | −8.9% |

| Year | Pop. | ±% |
|---|---|---|
| 1980 | 950 | −12.0% |
| 1991 | 905 | −4.7% |
| 2001 | 914 | +1.0% |
| 2011 | 1,935 | +111.7% |
| 2021 | 2,433 | +25.7% |

Source: Censuses

== Transport ==
The D5 motorway (part of the European route E50) from Prague to Beroun runs along the northwestern municipal border.

Nučice is located on the railway line Prague–Beroun. The town is served by two train stations called Nučice and Nučice zastávka.

== Sights ==
There are no protected cultural monuments in the municipality.

In the centre of Nučice is the Chapel of Saint Procopius, built in 1892–1893.
