= Heřmaň =

Heřmaň may refer to places in the Czech Republic:

- Heřmaň (České Budějovice District), a municipality and village in the South Bohemian Region
- Heřmaň (Písek District), a municipality and village in the South Bohemian Region
- Heřmaň, a village and part of Jeřišno in the Vysočina Region
