= Chuchel (Jeřišno) =

- Village
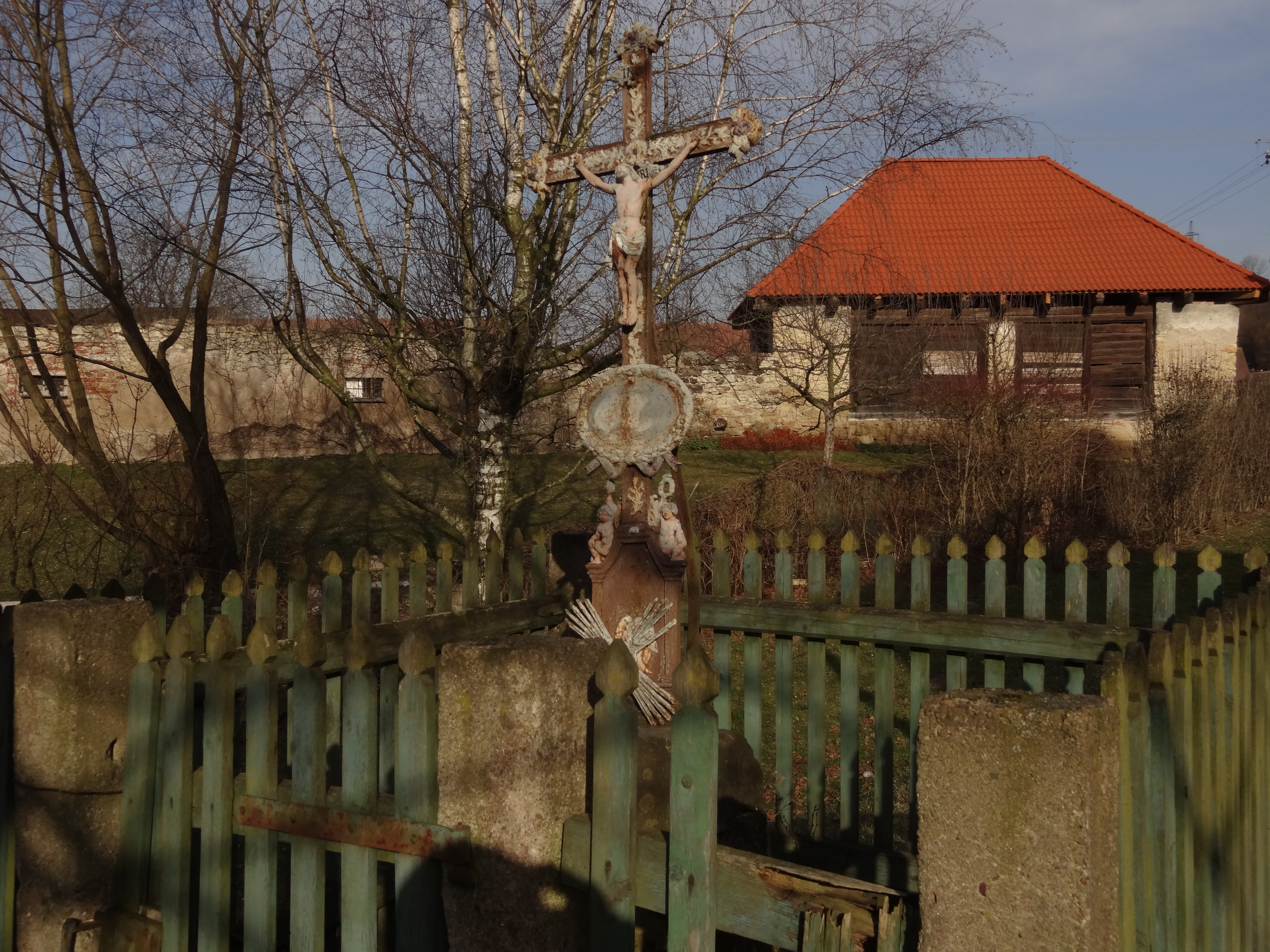
- Cross close to the old farmhouse

- Location in the Czech Republic
- Coordinates: 49°48′19″N 15°37′40″E
- Country: Czech Republic
- Region: Vysočina
- District: Havlíčkův Brod
- Municipality: Jeřišno
- First mentioned: 1257

Area
  - Total: 2.47 km^{2} (0.95 sq mi)

Population (2021)
  - Total: 48
  - Density: 19/km^{2} (50/sq mi)
- Time zone: UTC+1 (CET)
  - Summer (DST): UTC+2 (CEST)
- Postal code: 583 01

Chuchel is a village in the Havlíčkův Brod District, Vysočina Region, Czech Republic. It belongs administratively to the municipality of Jeřišno. By around 1900, the settlement had 236 inhabitants, but today it has less than sixty permanent residents.
