= Heřmaň (České Budějovice District) =

- Municipality
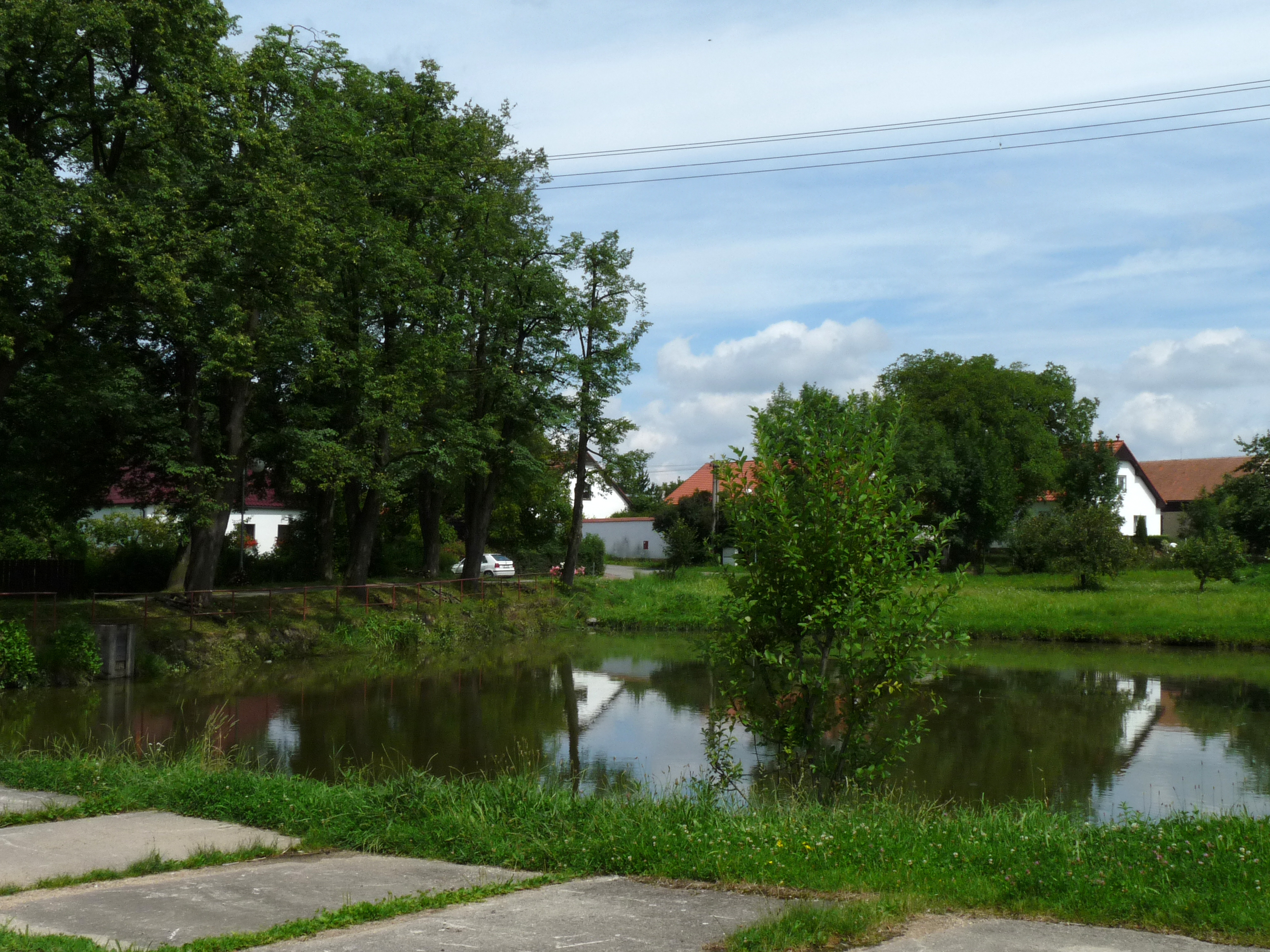
- Centre of Heřmaň

- Location in the Czech Republic
- Coordinates: 48°54′41″N 14°30′13″E
- Country: Czech Republic
- Region: South Bohemian
- District: České Budějovice
- Founded: 1787

Area
  - Total: 2.18 km^{2} (0.84 sq mi)
- Elevation: 472 m (1,549 ft)

Population (2026-01-01)
  - Total: 211
  - Density: 96.8/km^{2} (251/sq mi)
- Time zone: UTC+1 (CET)
  - Summer (DST): UTC+2 (CEST)
- Postal code: 370 07
- Website: www.obec-herman.cz

Heřmaň (Czech pronunciation: [ˈɦɛr̝maɲ]; German: Hermansdorf) is a municipality and village in České Budějovice District in the South Bohemian Region of the Czech Republic. It has about 200 inhabitants.

== History ==
The first written mention of Lhota, a farmyard that was the predecessor of Heřmaň, is from 1400. The village of Heřmaň was established on its site in 1787.

== Demographics ==
Historical population
Year	Pop.	±%
1869	267	—
1880	259	−3.0%
1890	273	+5.4%
1900	268	−1.8%
1910	285	+6.3%
1921	258	−9.5%
1930	273	+5.8%
1950	199	−27.1%
1961	219	+10.1%
1970	174	−20.5%
1980	175	+0.6%
1991	122	−30.3%
2001	144	+18.0%
2011	187	+29.9%
2021	204	+9.1%
Source: Censuses
