= Jeřišno =

- Municipality
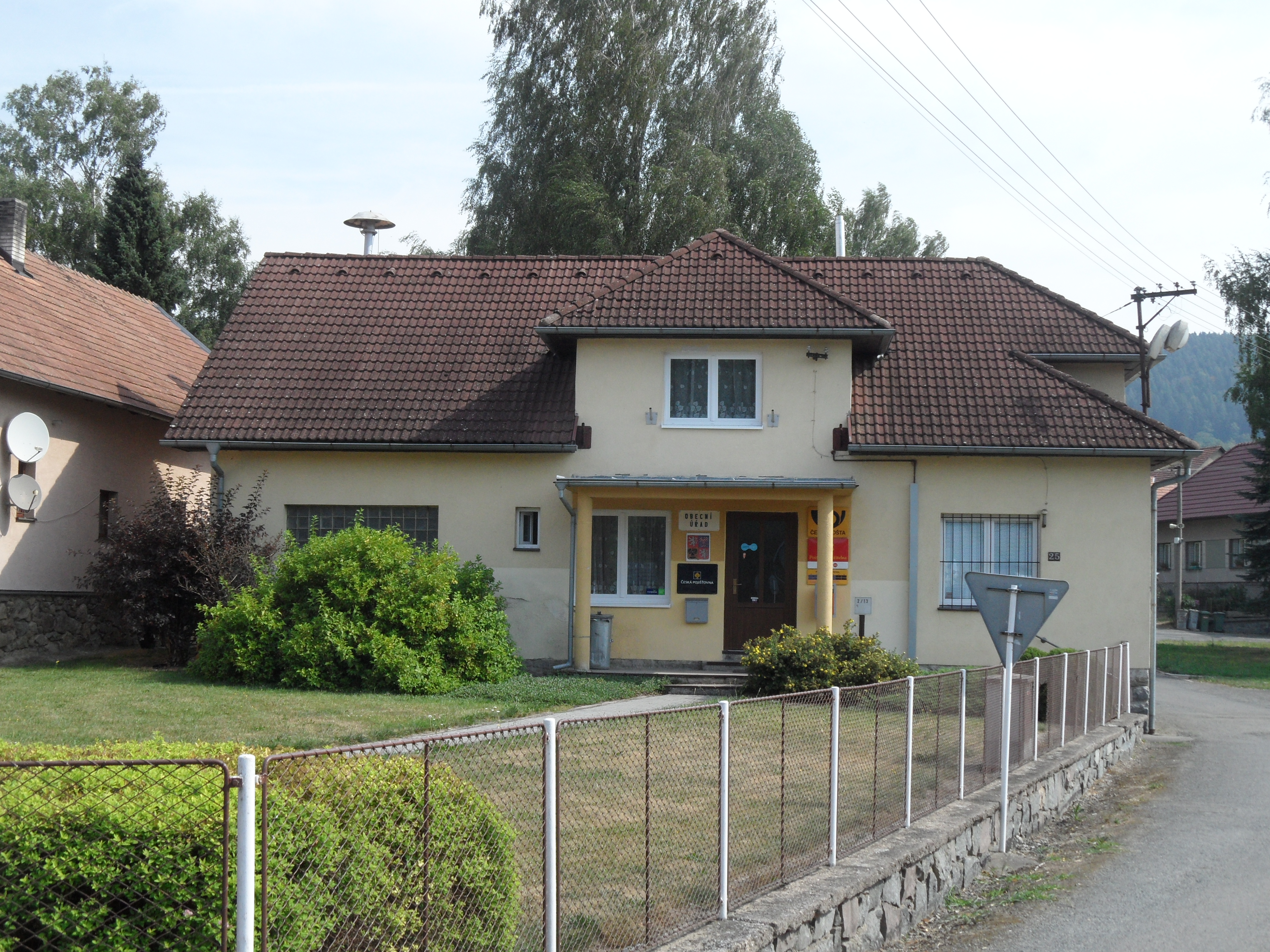
- Municipal office and post office

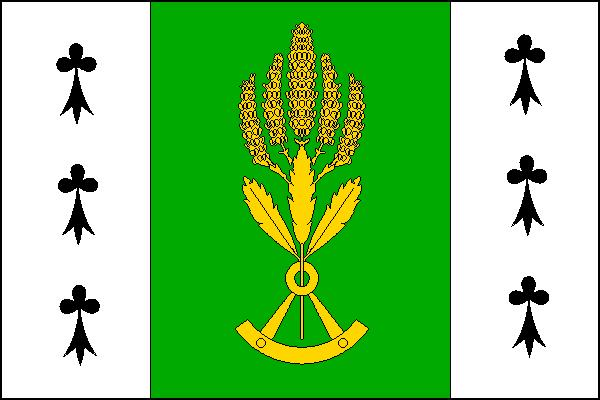
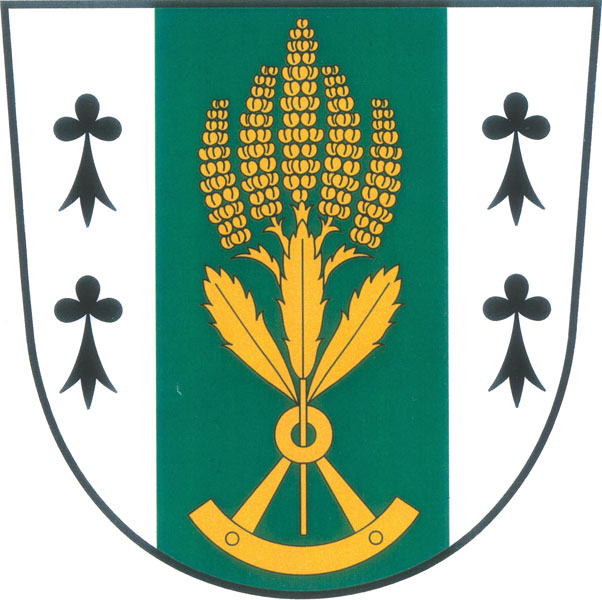
- Flag Coat of arms

- Location in the Czech Republic
- Coordinates: 49°47′33″N 15°38′30″E
- Country: Czech Republic
- Region: Vysočina
- District: Havlíčkův Brod
- First mentioned: 1406

Area
  - Total: 10.16 km^{2} (3.92 sq mi)
- Elevation: 375 m (1,230 ft)

Population (2026-01-01)
  - Total: 269
  - Density: 26.5/km^{2} (68.6/sq mi)
- Time zone: UTC+1 (CET)
  - Summer (DST): UTC+2 (CEST)
- Postal codes: 582 74, 583 01
- Website: www.jerisno.cz

Jeřišno is a municipality and village in Havlíčkův Brod District in the Vysočina Region of the Czech Republic. It has about 300 inhabitants.

Jeřišno lies approximately 22 kilometres (14 mi) north of Havlíčkův Brod, 45 km (28 mi) north of Jihlava, and 94 km (58 mi) east of Prague.

== Administrative division ==
Jeřišno consists of five municipal parts (in brackets population according to the 2021 census):

- Jeřišno (134)
- Chuchel (48)
- Heřmaň (17)
- Podhořice (14)
- Vestecká Lhotka (37)

== Demographics ==
Historical population
Year	Pop.	±%
1869	925	—
1880	879	−5.0%
1890	833	−5.2%
1900	767	−7.9%
1910	798	+4.0%
1921	769	−3.6%
1930	683	−11.2%
1950	493	−27.8%
1961	553	+12.2%
1970	456	−17.5%
1980	386	−15.4%
1991	316	−18.1%
2001	301	−4.7%
2011	303	+0.7%
2021	250	−17.5%
Source: Censuses
