= Habri =

Habri may refer to:

- Habří, a municipality and village in the Czech Republic
- Kamel Habri (born 1976), Algerian footballer
