= Habří =

- Municipality
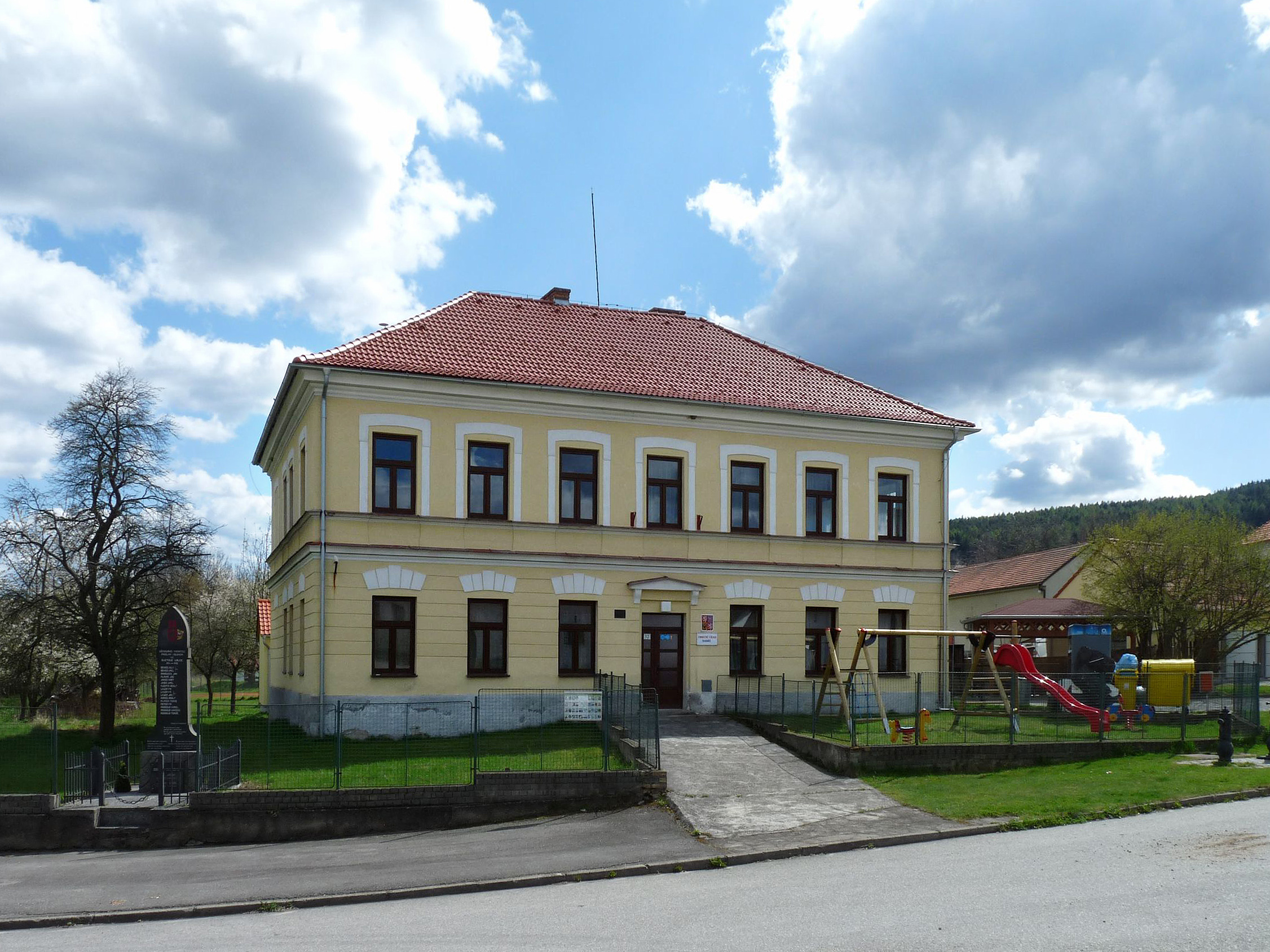
- Municipal office

- Location in the Czech Republic
- Coordinates: 48°56′54″N 14°20′5″E
- Country: Czech Republic
- Region: South Bohemian
- District: České Budějovice
- First mentioned: 1264

Area
  - Total: 5.22 km^{2} (2.02 sq mi)
- Elevation: 463 m (1,519 ft)

Population (2026-01-01)
  - Total: 126
  - Density: 24.1/km^{2} (62.5/sq mi)
- Time zone: UTC+1 (CET)
  - Summer (DST): UTC+2 (CEST)
- Postal code: 373 84
- Website: www.habri.cz

Habří is a municipality and village in České Budějovice District in the South Bohemian Region of the Czech Republic. It has about 100 inhabitants.

Habří lies approximately 11 kilometres (7 mi) west of České Budějovice and 127 km (79 mi) south of Prague.

== Demographics ==
Historical population
Year	Pop.	±%
1869	301	—
1880	356	+18.3%
1890	336	−5.6%
1900	280	−16.7%
1910	281	+0.4%
1921	261	−7.1%
1930	237	−9.2%
1950	182	−23.2%
1961	178	−2.2%
1970	136	−23.6%
1980	109	−19.9%
1991	93	−14.7%
2001	84	−9.7%
2011	99	+17.9%
2021	110	+11.1%
Source: Censuses
