= České Budějovice =

City in the Czech Republic

- Statutory city
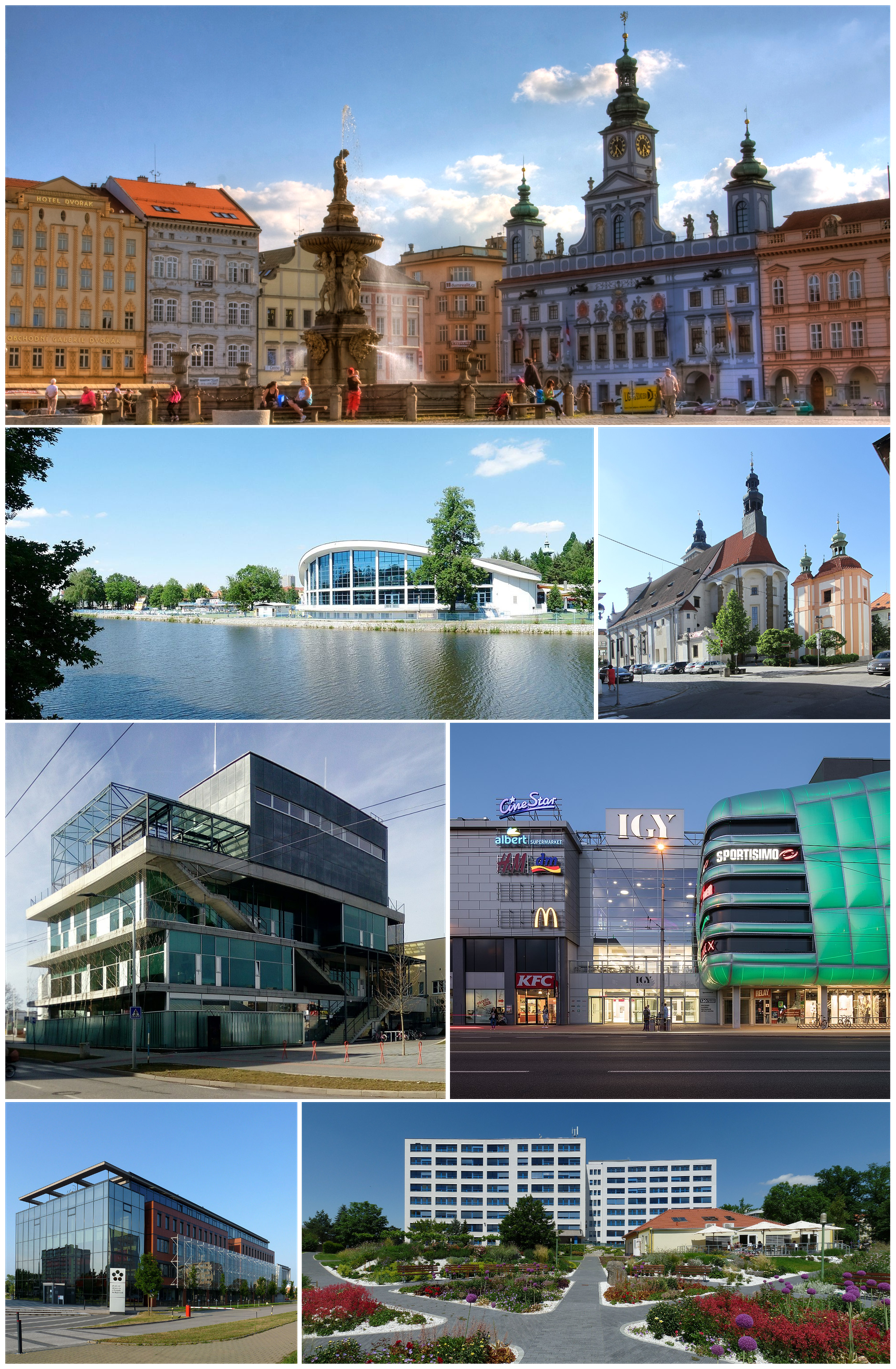
- From top: Přemysl Otakar II. Square, city swimming stadium, Cathedral of St. Nicholas, Máj centre, IGY shopping centre, Faculty of Arts of the University of South Bohemia, regional hospital

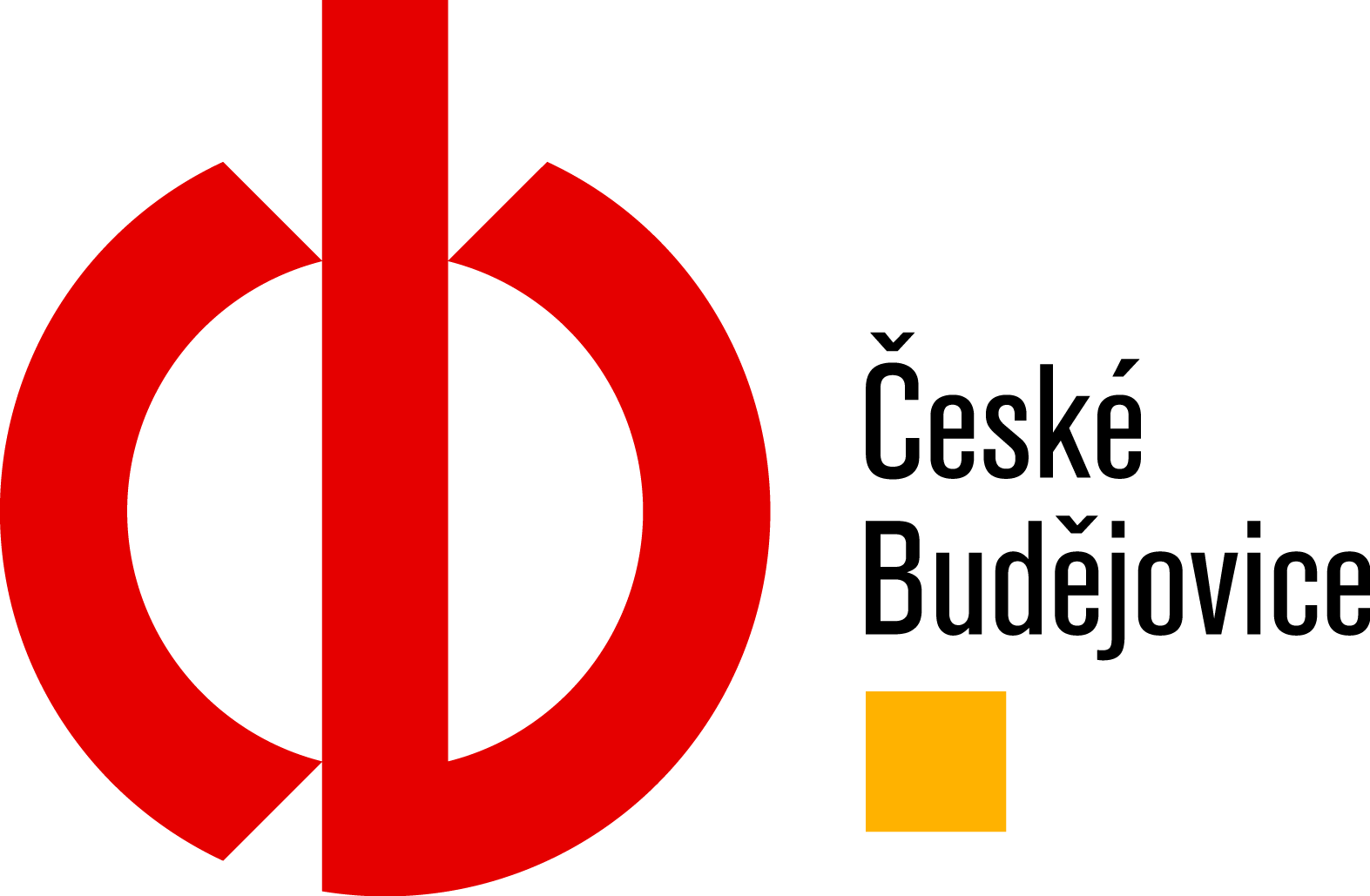
- Flag Coat of arms Wordmark

- Location in the Czech Republic
- Coordinates: 48°58′29″N 14°28′29″E
- Country: Czech Republic
- Region: South Bohemian
- District: České Budějovice
- First mentioned: 1251

Government
  - Mayor: Dagmar Škodová Parmová

Area
  - Total: 55.71 km^{2} (21.51 sq mi)
- Elevation: 381 m (1,250 ft)

Population (2026-01-01)
  - Total: 97,128
  - Density: 1,743/km^{2} (4,516/sq mi)
- Time zone: UTC+1 (CET)
  - Summer (DST): UTC+2 (CEST)
- Postal code: 370 01
- Website: www.c-budejovice.cz/en

České Budějovice (Czech pronunciation: [ˈtʃɛskɛː ˈbuɟɛjovɪtsɛ]; German: Budweis) is a city in the South Bohemian Region of the Czech Republic. It has about 97,000 inhabitants. The city is located in the valley of the Vltava River, at its confluence with the Malše.

České Budějovice is the largest city in the region and its political and commercial capital, the seat of the Diocese of České Budějovice and the University of South Bohemia in České Budějovice. The city is known for its long tradition of beer brewing, especially in the Budweiser Budvar Brewery. České Budějovice is an important transport junction.

The historic city centre is well preserved and is protected as an urban monument reservation. The Přemysl Otakar II. Square is one of the largest city squares in the country. Among the main landmarks of České Budějovice are the Black Tower, City Hall, Cathedral of Saint Nicholas and Dominican Monastery.

== Administrative division ==
České Budějovice consists of seven municipal parts (in brackets population according to the 2021 census):

- České Budějovice 1 (3,024)
- České Budějovice 2 (36,041)
- České Budějovice 3 (25,568)
- České Budějovice 4 (1,999)
- České Budějovice 5 (8,171)
- České Budějovice 6 (8,839)
- České Budějovice 7 (12,022)

České Budějovice 5 forms an exclave of the municipal territory.

== Etymology ==
The name Budějovice is derived from personal Slavic name Budivoj, meaning "the village of Budivoj's people". The name first appeared as Budoywicz, then it appeared in various similar forms. The German name was created by transcribing and shortening the Czech name. When the royal city was founded in 1265, the name appeared as Budwoyz and then it was adapted to Budweis. The name Budvicium was used in Latin. After the Hussite revolution in the first half of the 15th century, the name České Budějovice ('Bohemian Budějovice') appeared to distinguish it from Moravské Budějovice ('Moravian Budějovice').

== Geography ==
České Budějovice is located about 120 kilometres (75 mi) south of Prague. It lies in the České Budějovice Basin, only a small eastern part of the municipal territory extends into the Třeboň Basin. The city is spread mostly across a plain making it nearly flat in the inner parts with hillier areas in the eastern suburbs. The highest point, located in the city's exclave, is at 560 m (1,840 ft) above sea level. The main part of the municipal territory does not exceed 452 m (1,483 ft).

České Budějovice is situated in the valley of the Vltava River, at its confluence with the Malše. A set of large fishponds is located in the northwestern part of the municipal territory. The largest pond is Novohaklovský rybník with an area of 47.2 hectares (117 acres). Several of the ponds lies within the nature reserve of Vrbenské rybníky.

=== Climate ===
České Budějovice has a cooler and wet inland version of a humid continental climate (Köppen: Dfb; Trewartha: Dcbo) with an average annual temperature of 8.3 °C (46.9 °F). There are four seasons, with a murky dry winter between early December and early March, a sunny and wetter spring between half of March up to half of May changing to a rainy and warm summer during late May and early September when a dry autumn lasting to late November begins. There are between 1,550 and 1,800 hours of sunshine in most years. The extreme temperature throughout the year ranged from c. −40 °C (−40 °F) on 11 February 1929 (Note: On this day, a temperature of −42.2 °C (−44.0 °F) was measured in the neighbouring municipality of Litvínovice, which is the lowest temperature in the history of measurements in the territory of the present-day Czech Republic. Historical value from Litvínovice is given in the Czech Hydrometeorological Institute's data for České Budějovice.) to 37.8 °C (100.0 °F) on 27 July 1983.

Climate data for České Budějovice, 1991–2020 normals, extremes 1883–present
Month	Jan	Feb	Mar	Apr	May	Jun	Jul	Aug	Sep	Oct	Nov	Dec	Year
Record high °C (°F)	19.4 (66.9)	20.2 (68.4)	24.8 (76.6)	29.9 (85.8)	34.2 (93.6)	36.1 (97.0)	39.0 (102.2)	37.1 (98.8)	34.5 (94.1)	30.3 (86.5)	22.7 (72.9)	18.3 (64.9)	39.0 (102.2)
Mean daily maximum °C (°F)	3.3 (37.9)	5.3 (41.5)	9.9 (49.8)	15.7 (60.3)	20.3 (68.5)	23.8 (74.8)	26.0 (78.8)	25.8 (78.4)	20.1 (68.2)	14.2 (57.6)	7.8 (46.0)	4.0 (39.2)	14.7 (58.5)
Daily mean °C (°F)	−0.3 (31.5)	0.8 (33.4)	4.5 (40.1)	9.4 (48.9)	14.0 (57.2)	17.6 (63.7)	19.2 (66.6)	18.7 (65.7)	13.7 (56.7)	8.8 (47.8)	4.1 (39.4)	0.6 (33.1)	9.3 (48.7)
Mean daily minimum °C (°F)	−3.5 (25.7)	−3.2 (26.2)	0.0 (32.0)	3.5 (38.3)	7.9 (46.2)	11.5 (52.7)	13.2 (55.8)	12.9 (55.2)	9.0 (48.2)	5.1 (41.2)	1.3 (34.3)	−2.3 (27.9)	4.6 (40.3)
Record low °C (°F)	−33.0 (−27.4)	−42.2 (−44.0)	−28.8 (−19.8)	−12.3 (9.9)	−4.5 (23.9)	−0.8 (30.6)	3.0 (37.4)	2.8 (37.0)	−3.0 (26.6)	−10.0 (14.0)	−16.0 (3.2)	−29.6 (−21.3)	−42.2 (−44.0)
Average precipitation mm (inches)	29.3 (1.15)	23.2 (0.91)	38.9 (1.53)	37.9 (1.49)	74.3 (2.93)	102.0 (4.02)	95.0 (3.74)	92.2 (3.63)	57.9 (2.28)	43.0 (1.69)	36.9 (1.45)	28.7 (1.13)	659.3 (25.96)
Average snowfall cm (inches)	16.1 (6.3)	11.5 (4.5)	7.1 (2.8)	1.3 (0.5)	0.0 (0.0)	0.0 (0.0)	0.0 (0.0)	0.0 (0.0)	0.0 (0.0)	0.4 (0.2)	5.2 (2.0)	9.7 (3.8)	51.4 (20.2)
Average precipitation days (≥ 1.0 mm)	7.3	5.7	8.5	7.1	10.7	10.3	10.8	9.2	8.0	7.5	7.9	6.9	100.1
Average relative humidity (%)	80.0	75.5	71.3	66.2	67.7	68.5	68.4	70.8	77.1	80.4	83.5	81.8	74.3
Mean monthly sunshine hours	58.4	87.1	132.5	187.7	208.6	224.9	232.8	227.2	160.9	113.6	59.2	53.3	1,746.4
Source 1: NOAA
Source 2: Czech Hydrometeorological Institute

== History ==
=== 13th–18th centuries ===
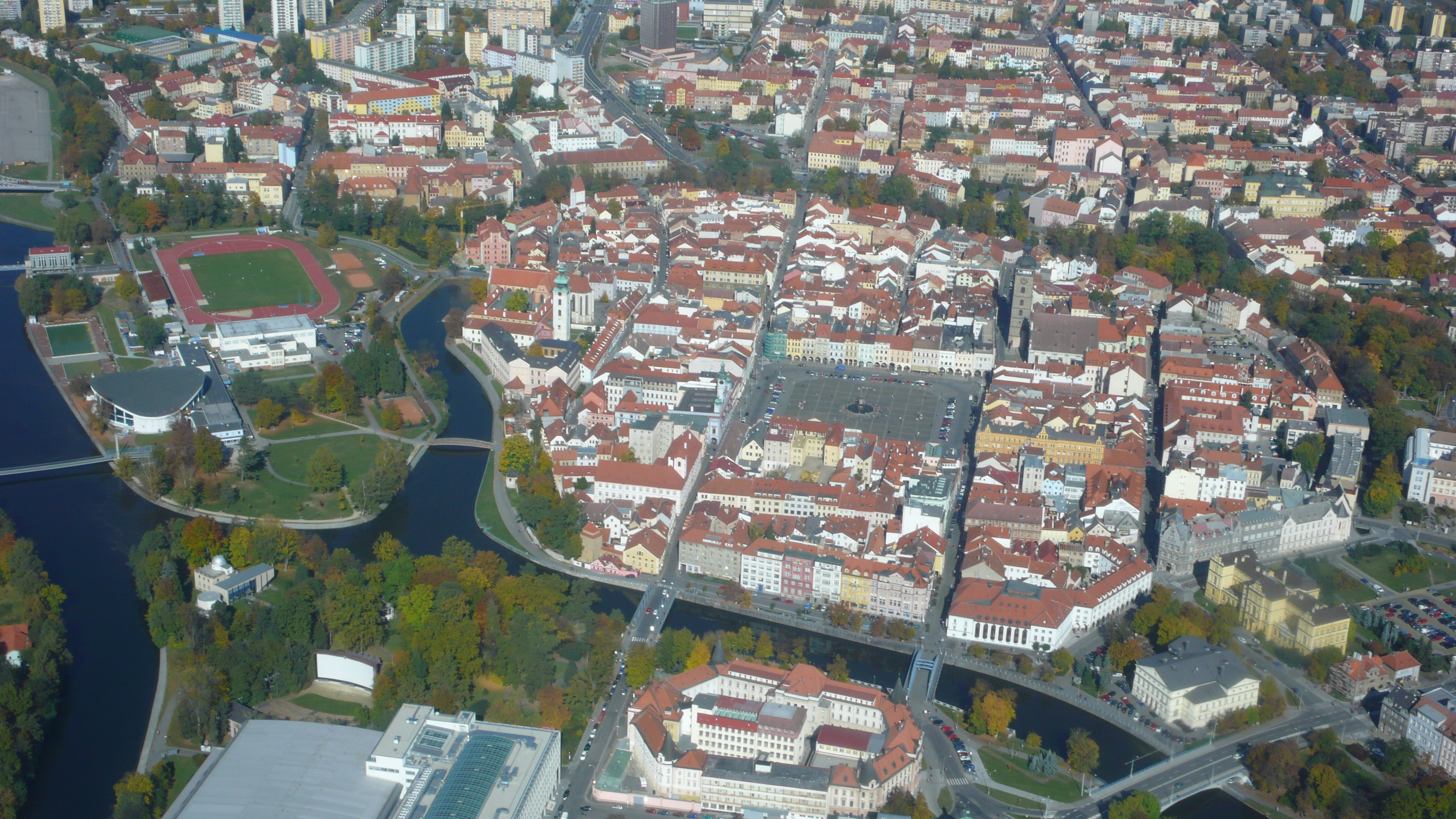
Aerial view of the historic centre

The first written mention of Budějovice is from 1251, when it was only a village. The royal city was founded on its site by King Ottokar II in 1265. The siting and planning of the city was carried out by the king's knight Hirzo. The city was fortified and had three gates. It immediately became the political and economic capital of south Bohemia. The city quickly became rich thanks to the development of trade and crafts and thanks to silver mining in the nearby area. The German-speaking settlers were coming from the Bohemian Forest and Upper Austria.

In 1341, King John of Bohemia allowed Jewish families to reside within the city walls. The first synagogue was built in 1380. At the turn of the 15th and 16th centuries, the Jewish community had about 100 inhabitants. In 1505–1506, a pogrom occurred and the Jews were expelled from the city. During the 16th century, the number of German craftsmen in the city increased. In the 18th century, Germans became the majority.

The city's fortifications were able to resist the Hussites during the Hussite Wars, but the city's development was disrupted by the Thirty Years' War and an extensive fire in 1641, during which two-thirds of the city was destroyed. Reconstructions in the Baroque style, which took place in the following decades, changed the architectural character of the city. In 1785, Pope Pius VI founded the Diocese of České Budějovice and the Church of Saint Nicholas was promoted to a cathedral.

=== 19th–20th centuries ===
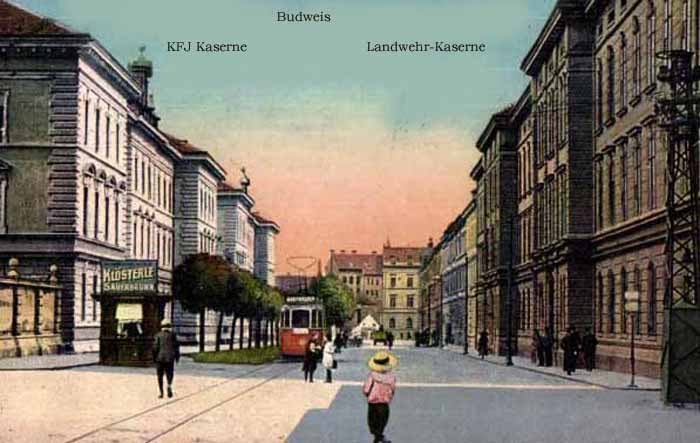
Trams on Radeckého Street (now Žižkova Street), c. 1909

Language map of Bohemia based on 1900 census, showing that the city was a German-speaking island

In the 19th century, the city was industrialised. During his time, České Budějovice became a major trade hub. The Budweis–Linz Horse-Drawn Railway was built in 1825–1832 and became the second oldest public line in continental Europe (after the Saint-Étienne-Andrézieux line in France). The production of Koh-i-Noor Hardtmuth pencils was relocated from Vienna to České Budějovice in 1847. Aside from Hardtmuth brothers, Adalbert Lanna the Elder belonged among the city's most prominent industrialists of the 19th century. In 1895, Český akciový pivovar (later known as Budweiser Budvar Brewery) was founded.

From 1848 until World War II, there was again a Jewish community here, which in 1925 numbered over 1,400 people. The city remained a predominantly German-speaking enclave until 1880, after which Czechs became the majority again. Until the end of World War II, the city contained a significant German minority (about 15.5% in 1930). The ratios between the Germans and the Czechs were in 1880: 11,829 Germans to 11,812 Czechs, in 1890: 11,642 to 16,585, in 1900: 15,436 to 23,427, in 1910: 16,903 to 27,309 and in 1921: 7,415 to 35,800. The reason for the change in the ratio was the high increase in the city's population, mainly caused by newly immigrated Czechs. The share of Germans fell below the legal limit of 20% and thus the Czech language became the only official language.

The coexistence of Czechs and Germans was mostly peaceful, which changed only in the 1930s, when many of the Germans in the city tended to Nazism. During the Occupation of Czechoslovakia in 1939–1945, the city was part of the Protectorate of Bohemia and Moravia. There was said to be established then a Gestapo prison and a forced labour camp in the city. During the final stages of World War II, in March 1945, České Budějovice was significantly damaged by United States Army Air Forces raids on strategic locations. At the end of the war, on 9 or 10 May 1945, Soviet troops occupied the city. The almost entire German population, which numbered 6,000 people, was then expelled under the Beneš decrees.

== Demographics ==
Historical population

Year	Pop.	±%
1869	19,232	—
1880	26,039	+35.4%
1890	32,134	+23.4%
1900	45,524	+41.7%
1910	54,786	+20.3%

Year	Pop.	±%
1921	57,557	+5.1%
1930	59,079	+2.6%
1950	55,709	−5.7%
1961	64,661	+16.1%
1970	76,699	+18.6%

Year	Pop.	±%
1980	88,448	+15.3%
1991	97,243	+9.9%
2001	97,339	+0.1%
2011	93,715	−3.7%
2021	95,664	+2.1%

Source: Censuses

== Economy ==
České Budějovice is the economic centre of the entire South Bohemian Region and the seat of many large corporations. The largest employers with its headquarters in České Budějovice and at least 1,000 employees are:

Economic entity	Number of employees	Main activity
České Budějovice Hospital	4,000–4,999	Health care
dm-drogerie markt	3,000–3,999	Retail sale
Robert Bosch	3,000–3,999	Manufacture of parts for motor vehicles
University of South Bohemia in České Budějovice	2,500–2,999	Education
Regional Police Directorate of the South Bohemian Region	2,500–2,999	Public administration
Madeta	1,500–1,999	Dairy
Swietelsky stavební	1,500–1,999	Construction
ČEVAK	1,000–1,499	Operation of water management infrastructure
E.ON Česká republika	1,000–1,499	Distributor of electricity and natural gas
Jednota	1,000–1,499	Retail sale

The České Budějovice agglomeration was defined as a tool for drawing money from the European Structural and Investment Funds. It is an area that includes the city and its surroundings, linked to the city by commuting and migration. It has about 180,000 inhabitants.

=== Beer brewing ===
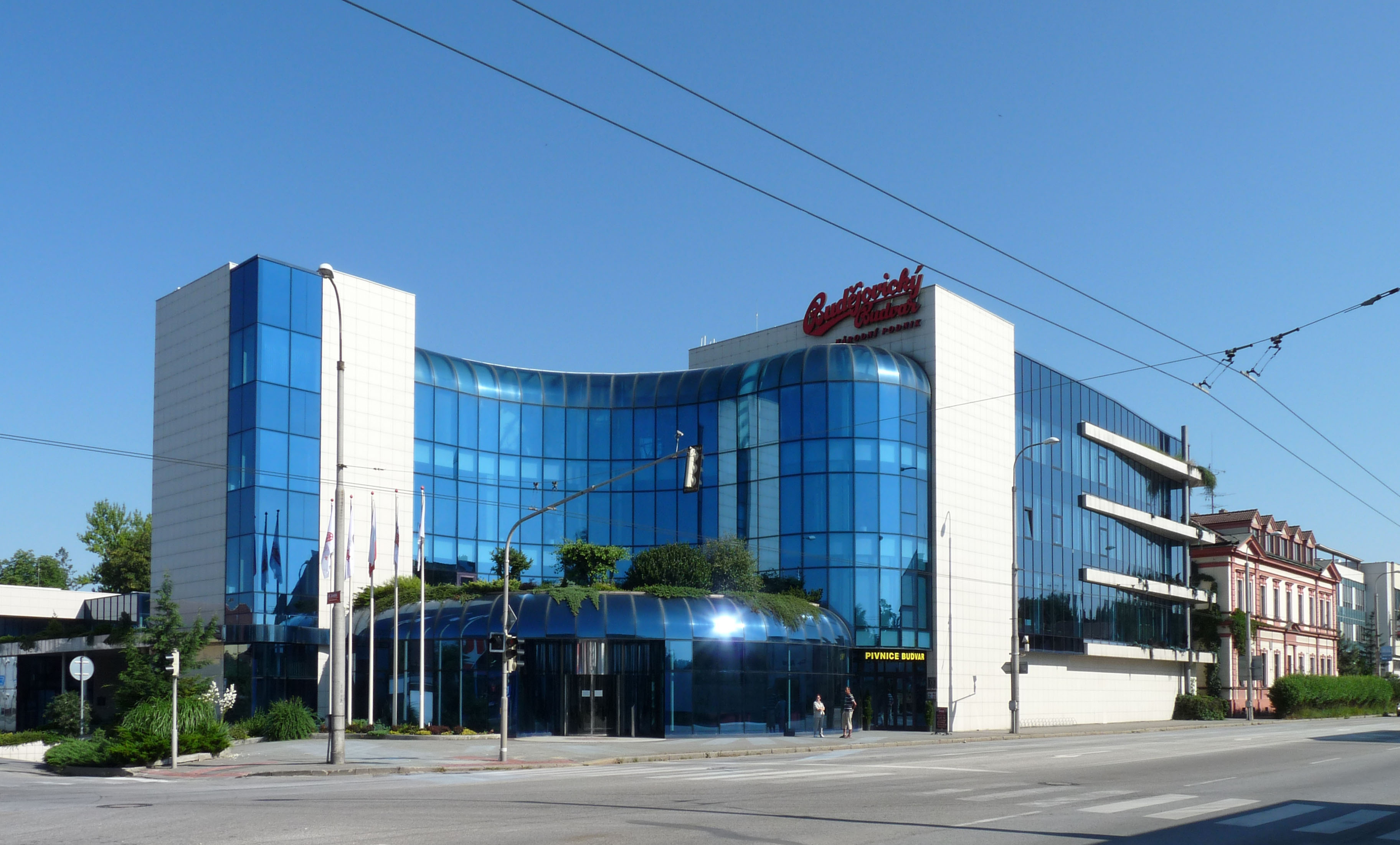
Budweiser Budvar Brewery

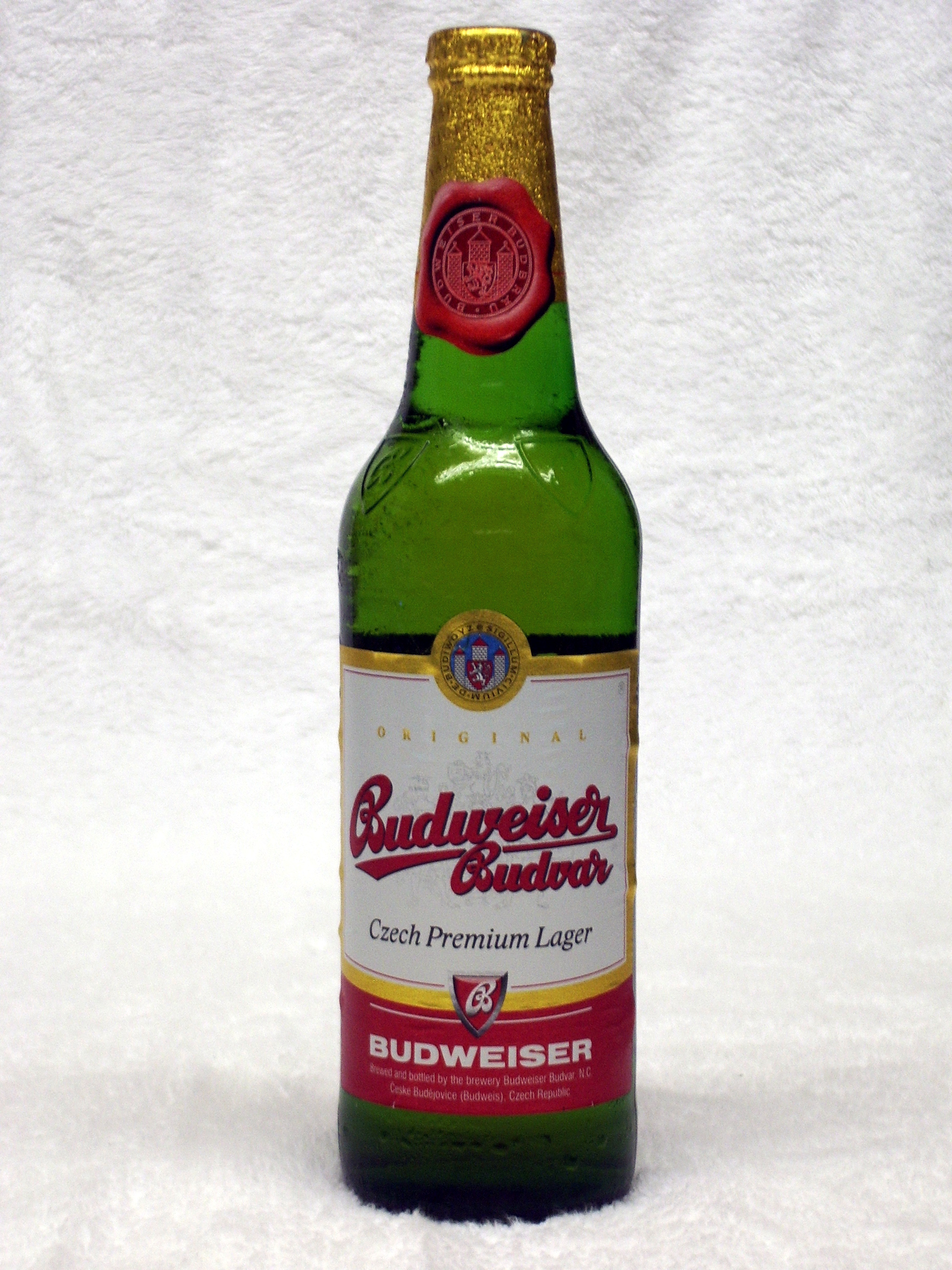
Budweiser Budvar, one of the world's most famous beers

Since its foundation in the 13th century, České Budějovice has been well known for brewing. In 1351, the city obtained the so-called "mile right" from the king, i.e. that no pubs outside the city can be located within a radius of 10 km, and from 1410, not even breweries. For a time, the town was the imperial brewery for the Holy Roman Emperor, and Budweiser Bier (i.e. beer from Budweis) became, along with Pilsner from Plzeň, one of the best-known lagers. Brewing remains a major industry.

The largest brewery, founded in 1895, is Budweiser Budvar, which has legal rights to market its beer under the "Budweiser" brand name in much of Europe. The same product is also sold elsewhere under the names "Budvar" and "Czechvar" due to legal disagreements with Anheuser-Busch over the Budweiser brand and Anheuser-Busch sells its beer as "Bud" in most of the European Union. The American lager was originally brewed as an imitation of the famous Bohemian original, but over time has developed its own identity and attained remarkable commercial success. Anheuser-Busch has made offers to buy out the Czech brewing company in order to secure global rights to the name "Budweiser", but the Czech government has refused all such offers, regarding the Czech Budweiser name as a matter of national pride.

The oldest operating and second largest brewery, founded in 1795, was renamed to "Pivovar Samson", replacing its original German name "Budweiser Bürgerbräu" during the communist period. It also exported, mostly under the "Samson" and "Crystal" labels. Recently, they reacquired naming rights for Budweiser for Europe while offering "B. B. Bürgerbräu" in the United States since 2005.

== Transport ==
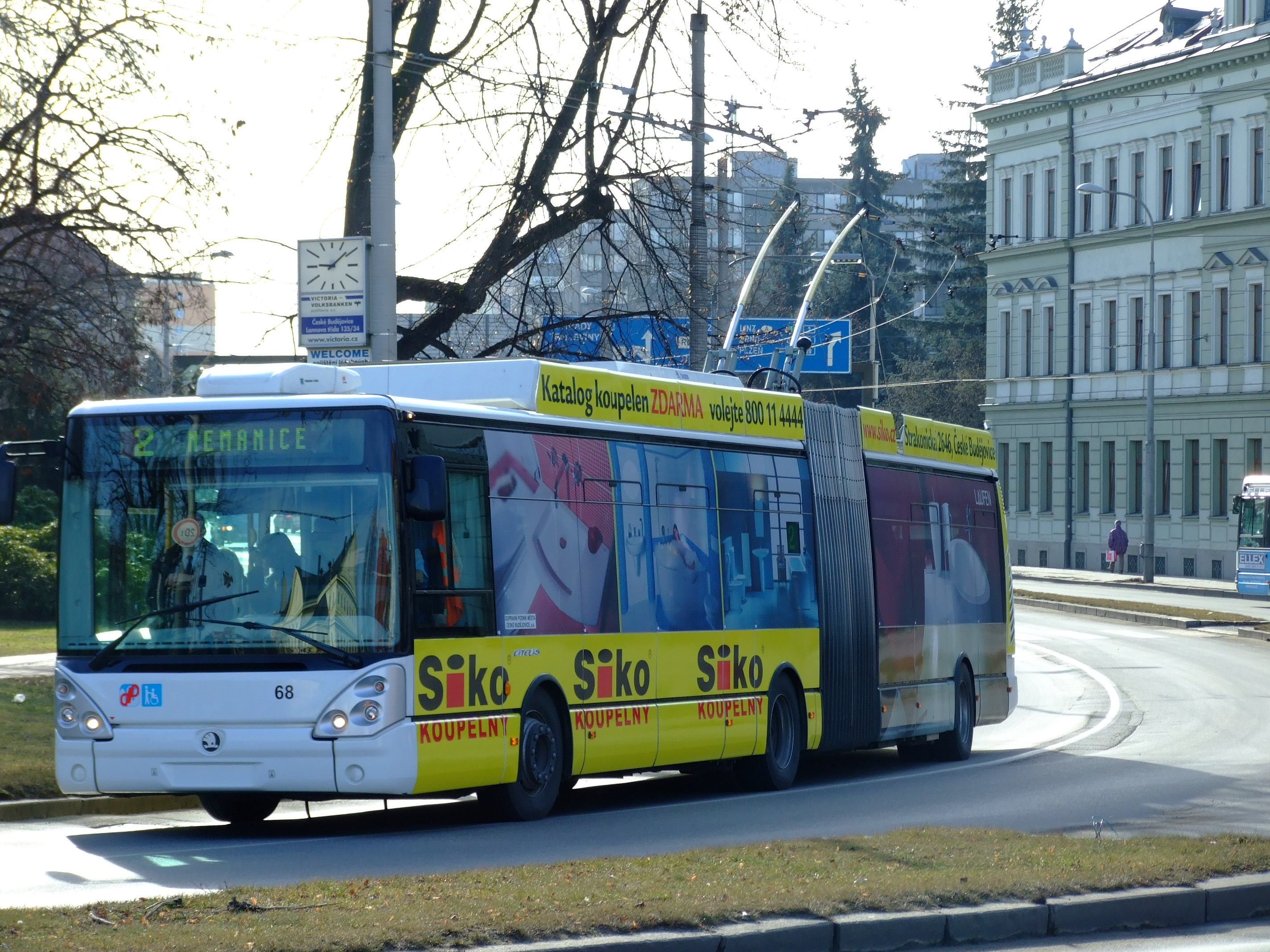
Trolleybus Škoda 25Tr serving the city

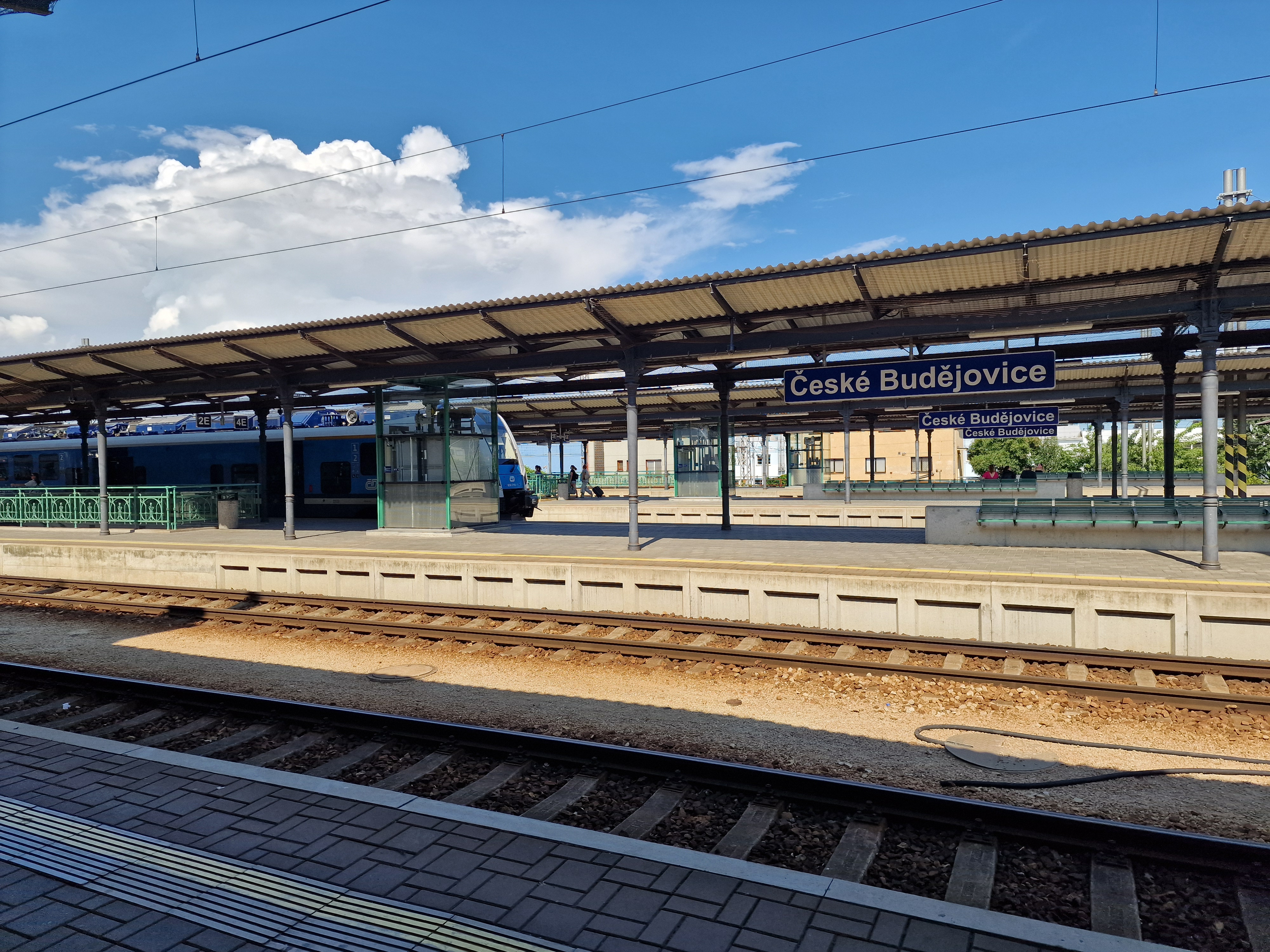
Railway station platforms and rails

The European route E55 (the section from Prague to the Czech–Austrian border at Dolní Dvořiště) passes through České Budějovice. The section from Prague to České Budějovice is formed by the D3 motorway. The section from České Budějovice to the Czech–Austrian border is formed by the I/3 road. The second notable road connection is the I/20 road (part of the European route E49), which connects České Budějovice with Plzeň and Karlovy Vary.

Direct international railways were built via České Budějovice by the Czech-Austrian companies Emperor Franz Joseph Railway in 1868 and Empress Elisabeth Railway in 1871, connecting Vienna with Plzeň and Prague with Zurich, via Linz and Salzburg. Today, the most important lines in operation are Prague–České Budějovice, České Budějovice–Linz and Plzeň–Jihlava. The city is served by four train stations. The main station is named České Budějovice; other stations in the city are České Budějovice severní zastávka, České Budějovice jižní zastávka and Nové Hodějovice.

Public domestic and international České Budějovice Airport is located 6 kilometres (3.7 mi) southwest from České Budějovice, in the territory of the municipalities of Planá and Homole.

Intra-city transport is provided by buses and trolleybuses. Buses provide 16 lines (including 3 electric buses) and trolleybuses provide 7 lines. The transport company is owned by the city.

== Culture ==
The most important annual event in the city is the Země Živitelka ('Earth the Breadwinner') exhibition. It is focused on agriculture and food industry. It takes place in the Výstaviště České Budějovice area, which is the largest area for holding exhibitions, cultural and social events in the city. Země Živitelka has been held regularly since 1973 and followed up on the exhibitions held here in 1960 and 1970.

In 2028, České Budějovice will be the European Capital of Culture.

== Sport ==
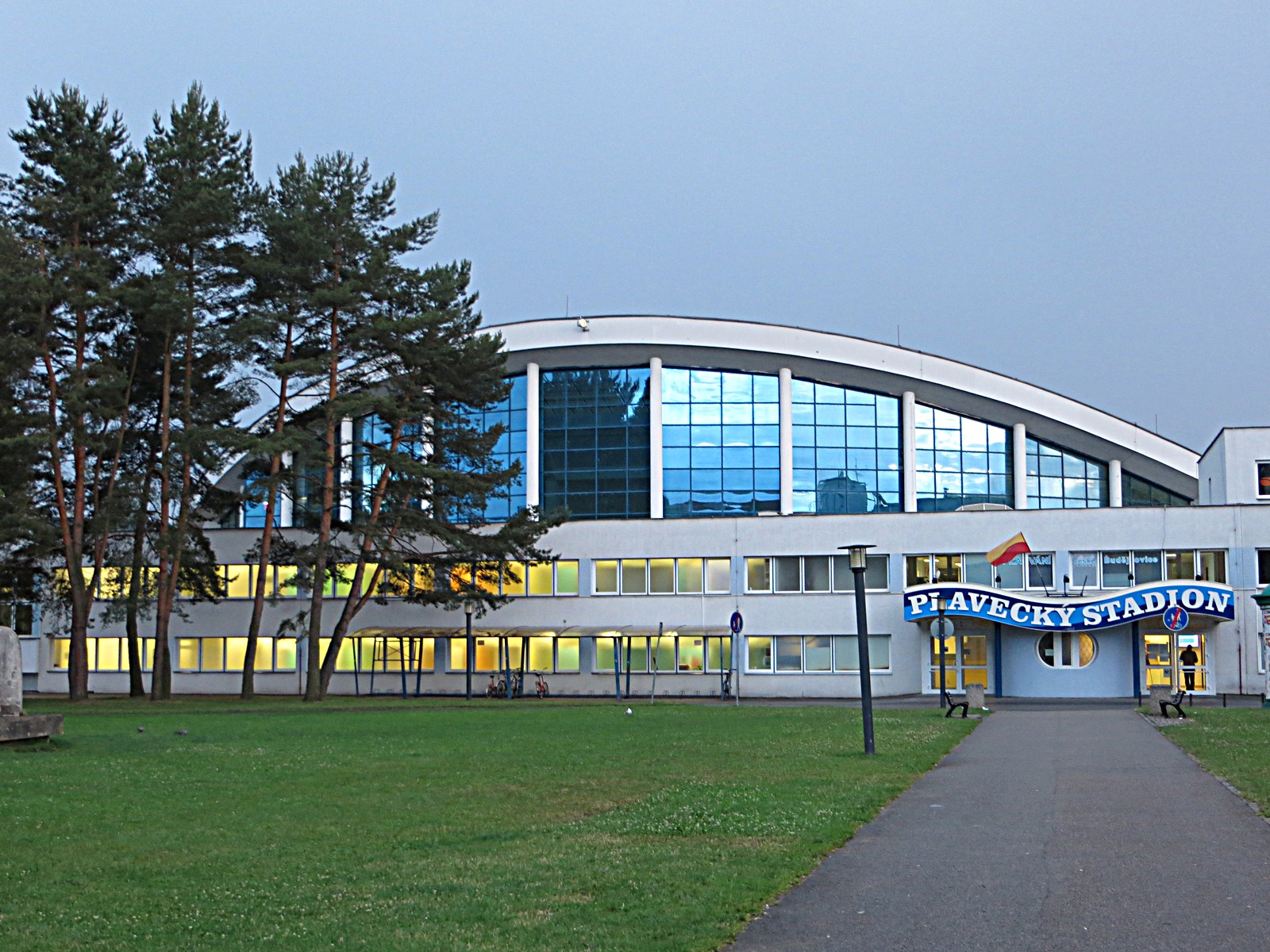
Swimming Stadium České Budějovice

=== Venues ===
České Budějovice is the site of many sports facilities and national stadiums, including the football Stadion Střelecký ostrov, the ice-hockey Budvar Arena and the Athletic Stadium Sokol.

The Swimming Stadium České Budějovice features a 50-metre indoor pool, a diving pool, saunas, an outdoor swimming pool and a children's pool. The swimming stadium is among the most architecturally significant sports buildings in the country and has been protected as a cultural monument since 2017.

Motorcycle speedway was a prominent sport in the city from 18 September 1956 until 1 July 1973. The speedway stadium on the Dlouhá louka, off Na Sádkách, opened in September 1955 and had a capacity of 30,000 spectators. The track was a 485-metre (530 yard) oval and a team representing the city participated in the inaugural Czechoslovak Team Speedway Championship in 1956.

=== Sport clubs ===
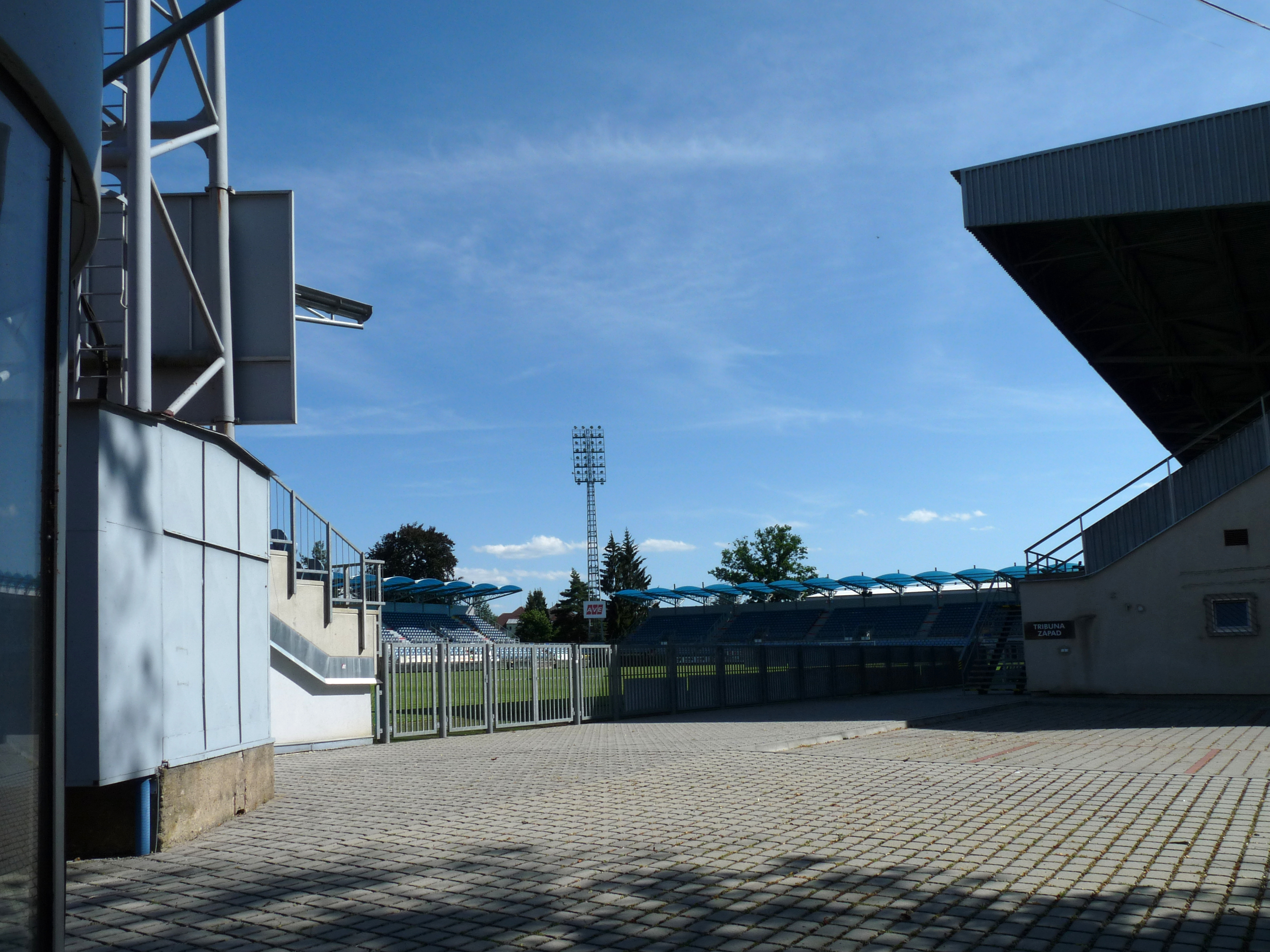
Střelecký ostrov, the football stadium

- SK Dynamo České Budějovice (association football – Czech National Football League)
- Motor České Budějovice (ice hockey – Czech Extraliga)
- Jihostroj České Budějovice (volleyball)
- TJ Sokol České Budějovice (athletics)
- Hellboys České Budějovice (american football)
- RC České Budějovice (rugby football)
- TJ Lokomotiva České Budějovice (handball)
- Budějovické Barakudy (cricket)
- FBC Štíři České Budějovice (floorball)
- TJ Dynamo České Budějovice (football tennis)
- SKVS České Budějovice (canoe slalom)

== Sights ==
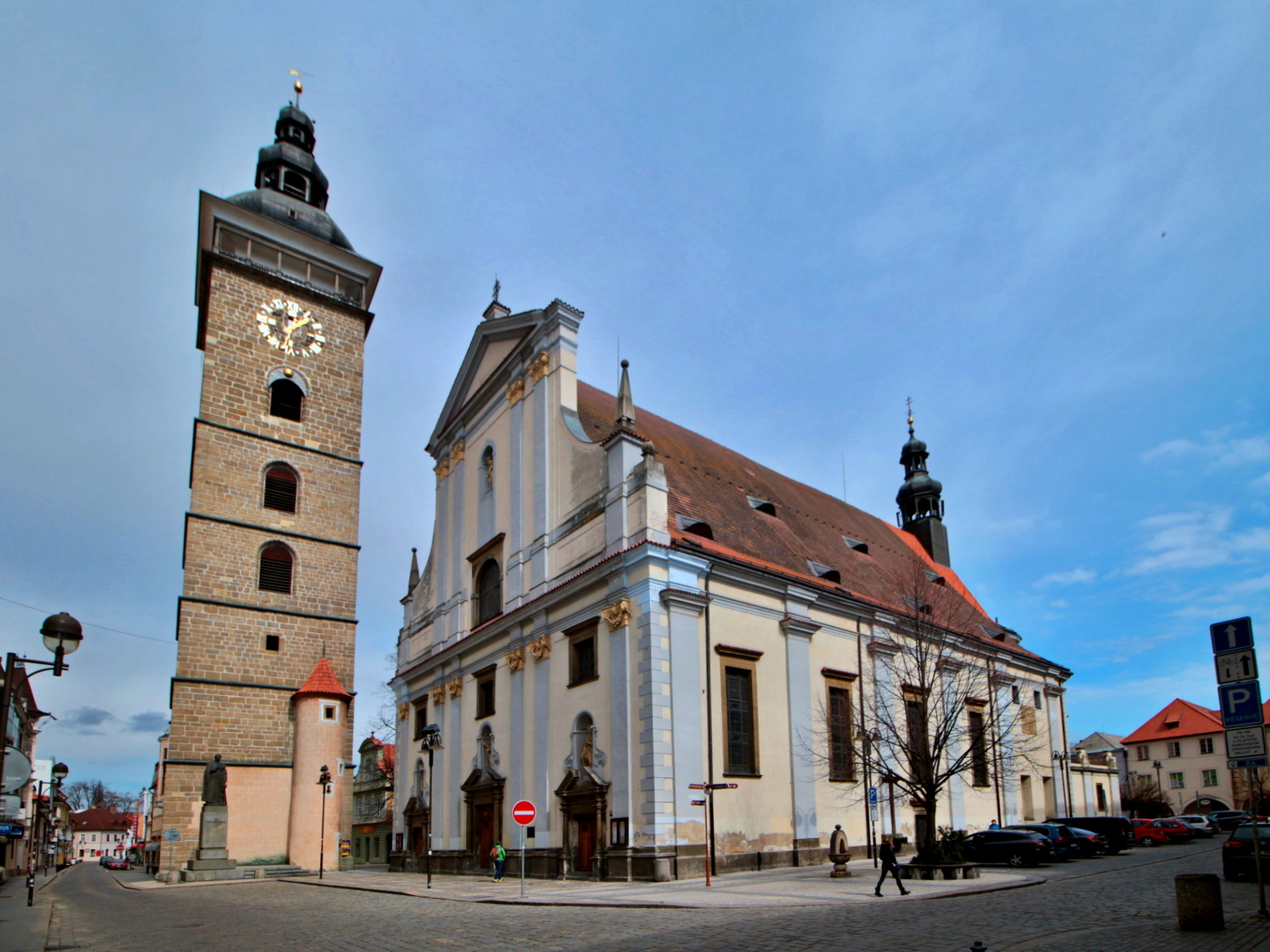
Black Tower and Cathedral of St. Nicholas

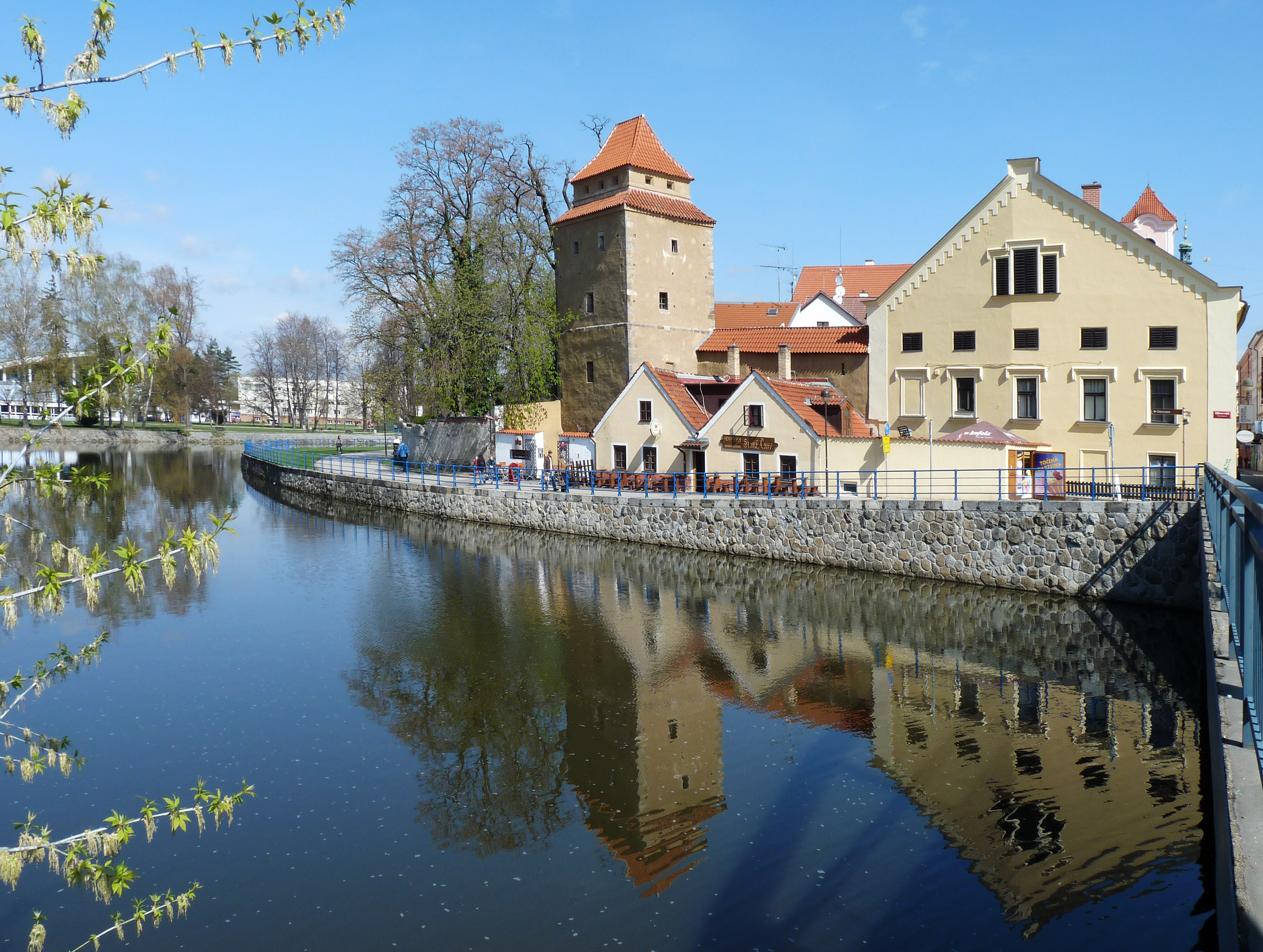
Iron Maiden Tower

The historic city centre is well preserved and is protected as an urban monument reservation.

Among the main landmarks of the city and most visited tourist destinations is the Black Tower (Černá věž). It was built in 1550–1577 as a guarding tower and a bell tower. It is 72 m (236 ft) high and 225 wooden steps lead to the top. The tower is equipped by six bells.

The Iron Maiden Tower and the Rabenštejn Tower are a 14th-century former prisons and two of the few remains of the Old Town's Gothic fortifications. Today the first one houses a pub and the second one houses an exhibition of armour and historical weapons. In 1872, the Gothic town walls were demolished.

=== City square ===
The historic city centre is formed by the large Přemysl Otakar II. Square and its surroundings. The city square has the shape of a regular square and belongs among the largest squares in the country. The square is lined with Renaissance and Baroque houses with arcades. Most of the houses have a Gothic core.

In the middle of the square is Samson Fountain. It is a Baroque fountain built in 1721–1727, which is the largest fountain in the Czech Republic with a diameter of 17 m (56 ft). Originally, it was not only decorative, but also served to supply the city with water from the Vltava river. Next to the fountain is the so-called Lost Rock, the only remnant of the original pavement.

The City Hall is the most distinctive house on the square. It was originally a Renaissance house from the mid-16th century, completely rebuilt in the Baroque style in 1727–1730 according to the design of Anton Erhard Martinelli. The façade with three towers is decorated with four allegorical sculptures. On the highest tower there is a carillon from 1995. The City Hall still serves its purpose today, but it also offers guided tours.

=== Sacral monuments ===
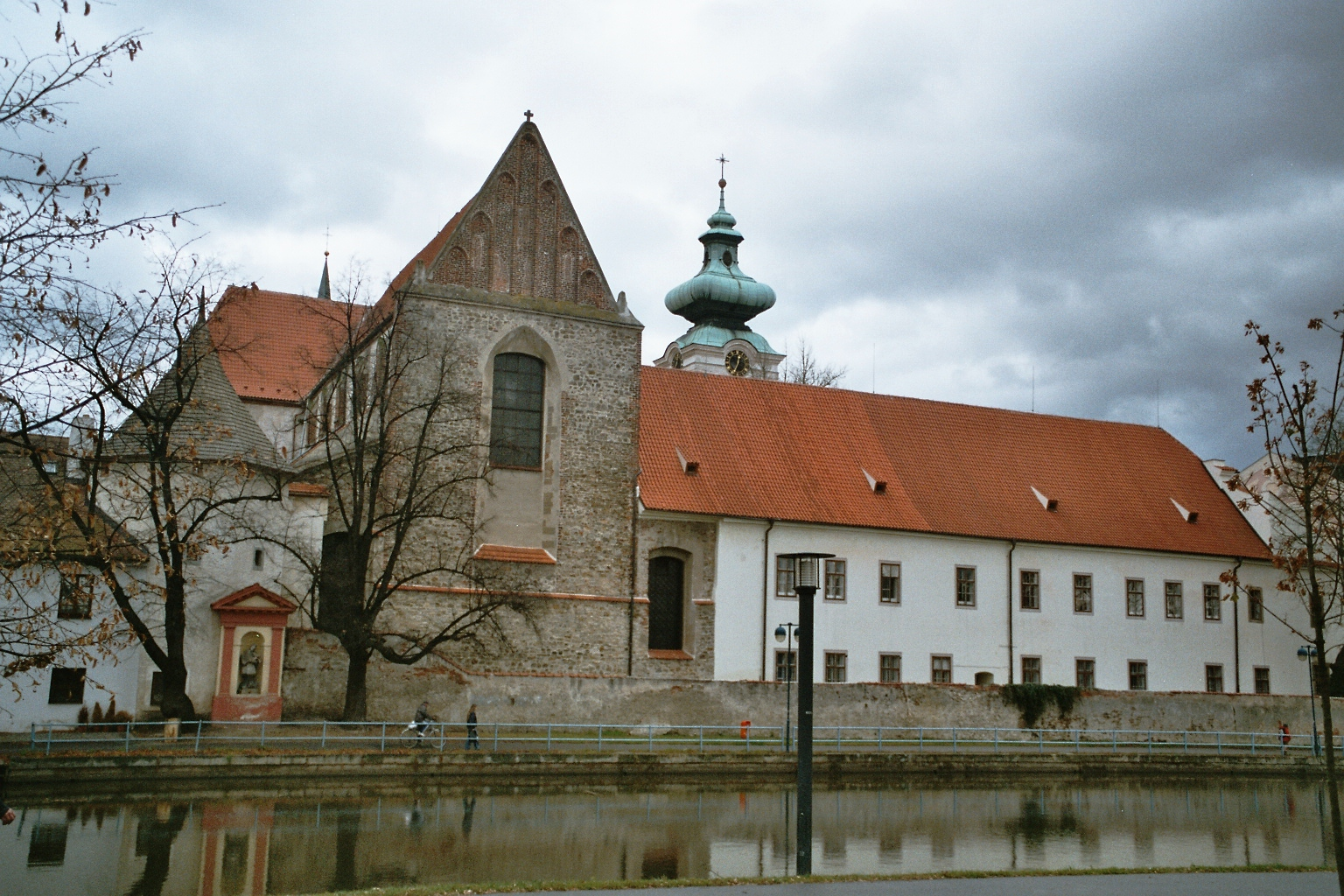
Church of the Presentation of the Blessed Virgin Mary (rear)

The Dominican Monastery with the Church of the Presentation of the Blessed Virgin Mary are the oldest monuments in the historic centre of České Budějovice. The monastery was founded in 1265 together with the city. The originally Gothic buildings were rebuilt in the Baroque style. The monastery was abolished in 1785. In 1865, the church was modified in the neo-Gothic style.

The former Capuchin monastery was founded in 1614. The Church of Saint Anne was built in the early Baroque style in 1615–1621. The monastery was abolished in 1804 and its building was rebuilt in the Neoclassical style in 1843–1844. In the 1980s, the church was converted into a concert hall.

The Cathedral of Saint Nicholas is a three-nave basilica, located near the main city square. It was founded in 1265. After the fire in 1641, it was rebuilt in the Renaissance style. In 1785, the church was promoted to a cathedral.

The Church of the Holy Family was built in the neo-Gothic style in 1886–1887. It has a valuable Beuron Art School decoration of the interior.

The Church of Saints John the Baptist and Procopius was founded in the first half of the 13th century, in the original village before the foundation of the royal city. It was expanded and modified many times; its present appearance is the result of regotisation in 1872. Next to the church is the oldest cemetery in České Budějovice with many valuable tombstones.

=== Museums ===
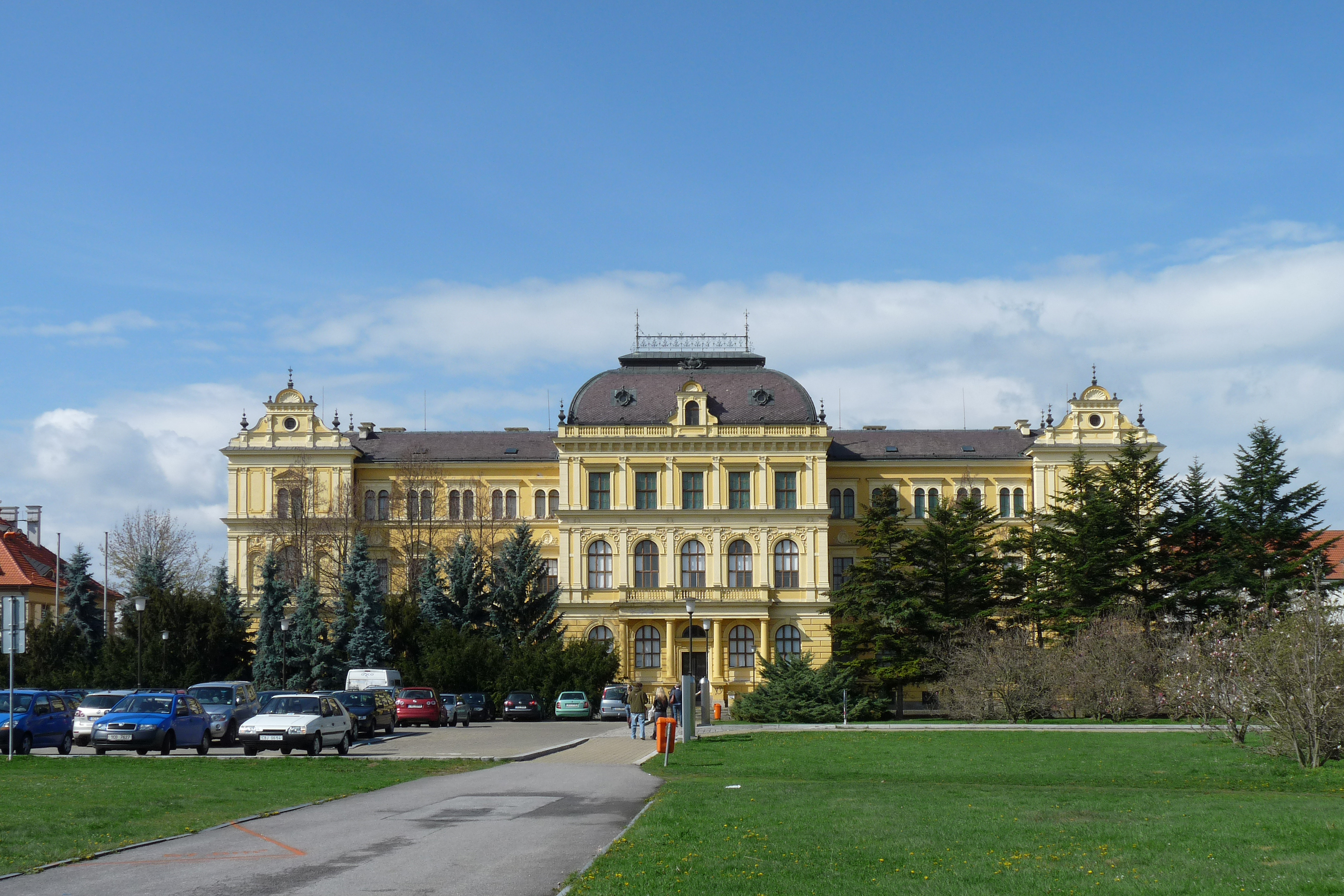
Museum of South Bohemia

The Museum of South Bohemia was founded in 1870 and opened to the public in 1877 in a house next to the city hall. The current museum was built in the Neo-Renaissance style in 1899–1901 and opened in 1903. The museum has four permanent exhibitions: archaeological, natural science, geological and ethnographic.

The Museum of the Horse Drawn Railway is a branch of the Museum of South Bohemia. It is located in a former guardhouse at the point where the Budweis–Linz Horse-Drawn Railway started. The house, as well as all the preserved sections of the horse-drawn railway, is protected as a national cultural monument.

== In literature ==
The city is one of the major settings in the novel The Good Soldier Švejk by Jaroslav Hašek. České Budějovice is the setting and was the working title for the play The Misunderstanding by Albert Camus.

== Notable people ==
- Adalbert Gyrowetz (1763–1850), composer
- Matyáš Kalina of Jäthenstein (1772–1848), archaeologist
- Franz Schuselka (1811–1886), politician
- Otto Pilny (1866–1936), painter
- Otto Steinhäusl (1879–1940), police officer
- Jan Palouš (1888–1971), ice hockey player
- Vlastimil Rada (1895–1962), painter and illustrator
- Rudolf Tomaschek (1895–1966), experimental physicist
- Anna Binder-Urbanová (1912–2004), philosophy lecturer
- Norbert Frýd (1913–1976), writer
- Rolf Thiele (1918–1994), film director and producer
- Haro Senft (1928–2016), film director
- Marta Kubišová (born 1942), singer
- Vladimír Remek (born 1948), cosmonaut, pilot and politician
- Pavel Tobiáš (born 1955), football player and manager
- František Straka (born 1958), football player and manager
- Zdeněk Tůma (born 1960), economist
- Ivana Červenková (born 1962), diplomat
- Karel Roden (born 1962), actor
- Karel Havlíček (born 1969), politician
- Karel Vácha (born 1970), footballer
- Jiří Lerch (born 1971), footballer
- Jaroslav Modrý (born 1971), ice hockey player
- Radek Mynář (born 1974), footballer
- Stanislav Neckář (born 1975), ice hockey player
- Václav Prospal (born 1975), ice hockey player
- Martin Hofmann (born 1978), actor
- Roman Lengyel (born 1978), footballer
- Vladimíra Uhlířová (born 1978), tennis player
- Josef Melichar (born 1979), ice hockey player
- David Lafata (born 1981), footballer
- Václav Nedorost (born 1982), ice hockey player
- Filip Novák (born 1982), ice hockey player
- Michal Trpák (born 1982), sculptor
- Jiří Kladrubský (born 1985), footballer
- Milan Gulaš (born 1985), ice hockey player
- Tomáš Mertl (born 1986), ice hockey player
- Martin Hanzal (born 1987), ice hockey player

== Twin towns – sister cities ==
České Budějovice is twinned with:

- Linz, Austria
- Lorient, France
- Nitra, Slovakia
- Passau, Germany
- Suhl, Germany

== See also ==
- St. Catherine of Boletice
