= Přemysl Otakar II. Square =

Square in České Budějovice, Czech Republic

- Náměstí Přemysla Otakara II. (Czech)
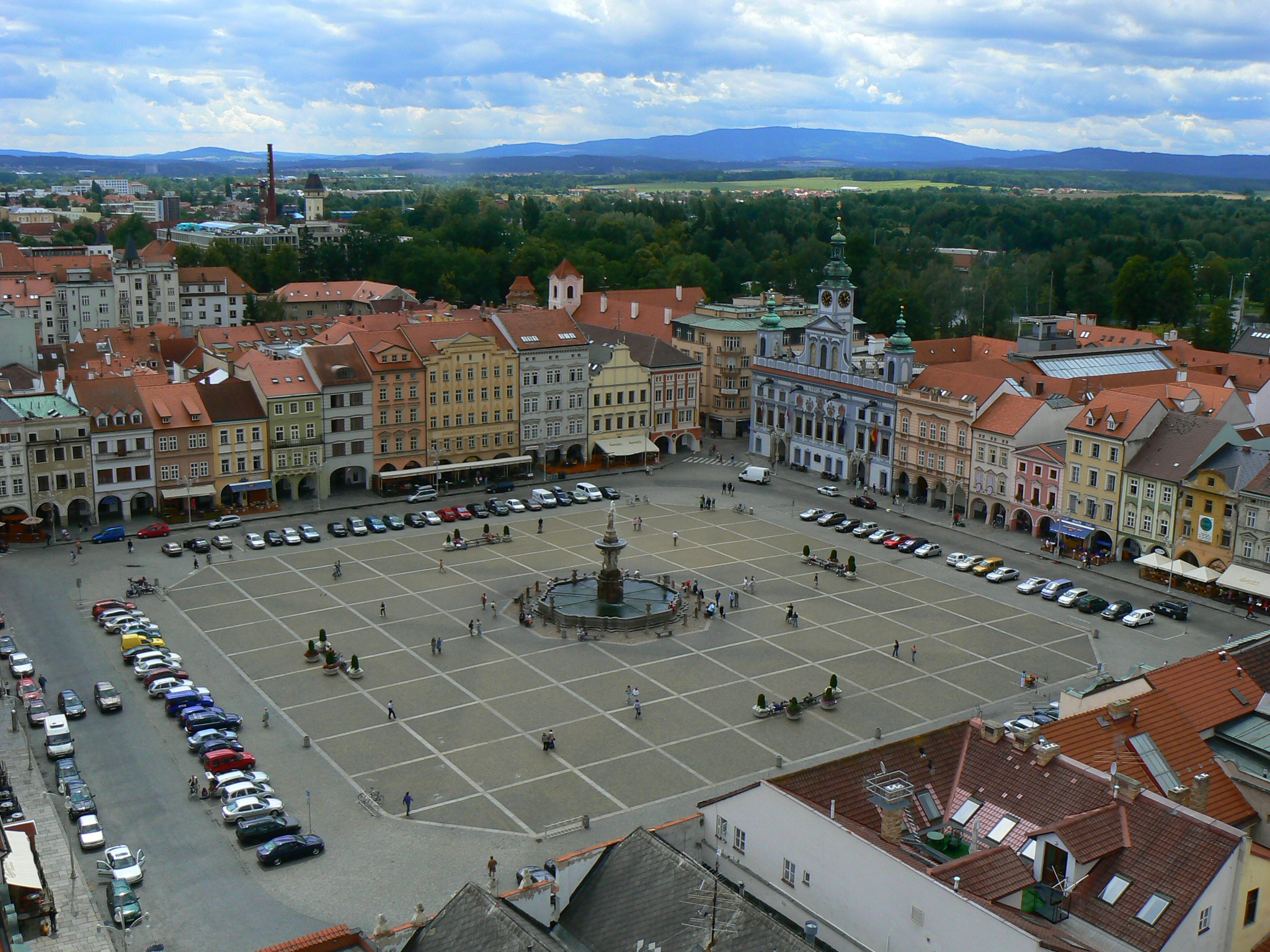
- Přemysl Otakar II. Square as seen from the Black Tower
- Constructed: 1265
- Dedicated to: Ottokar II of Bohemia
- Location: České Budějovice, Czech Republic
- Interactive map of Přemysl Otakar II. Square
- Coordinates: 48°58′28″N 14°28′27″E

Přemysl Otakar II. Square (Czech: Náměstí Přemysla Otakara II.) is a square in České Budějovice in the Czech Republic. It is the central public space in the historical city centre, named after the city's founder, Bohemian king Ottokar II (Czech: Přemysl Otakar II.). With an area of 17.968 ha (44.40 acres), it is the second largest square-shaped plaza in the Czech Republic after the square in Vysoké Mýto.

== History ==
In earlier times, there were various names for the square; the name Main Square is recorded in writing. From 1915, the square bore the following names:

- from 4 June 1915: Kaiser-Franz-Josef-Platz (Emperor Franz Joseph Square')
- from 11 November 1918: Náměstí svobody ('Freedom Square')
- from 24 May 1934: Masarykovo náměstí ('Masaryk Square')
- during the 1939–1945 occupation: Adolf Hitler Platz ('Adolf Hitler Square')
- from 9 May 1945: Masarykovo náměstí
- from 26 September 1951: Žižkovo náměstí ('Žižka Square')
- from 1 January 1991: Náměstí Přemysla Otakara II. ('Přemysl Otakar II. Square')

The almost regular square area of the square has dimensions of about 133×133 m. It was laid out around the year 1265 by Hirzo and surrounding it about 8 m wide plots were marked out for the construction of houses for the townspeople. As time passed, the town square was paved over and a well and execution ground (on the place of which the Stray boulder now lies) were built. For some time, the meat shops also stood here before they were torn down by the order of Charles IV and relocated to the Krajinská street. In the first half of the 20th century, trams also ran on the far sides of the square. The Black Tower and the Cathedral of St. Nicholas are located near the northeastern corner of the square.

== Area of the square ==
The square is almost perfectly square-shaped. The southern side has a length of 132.5 m (435 ft), the northern 137.4 m (451 ft), the eastern 134.1 m (440 ft) and the western 134 m (440 ft).

In the middle of the square is an 80×80 m area paved with ceramic tiles from 1939, with a 10 m wide strip adjacent on each side, used, among other things, as a parking lot. This surface therefore covers an area of 9,954 m^{2} (107,140 sq ft) (not 1 hectare due to the rounded corners). The roadway throughout the square has an area of 5,122 m^{2} (55,130 sq ft) and four sections between the roadway and the arcade 2,892 m^{2} (31,130 sq ft). The total area of the square is 17,968 m^{2} (193,410 sq ft), which makes it is the second largest square-shaped plaza in the Czech Republic after the square in Vysoké Mýto. The square is located at an altitude of 370.0–370.5 m. According to other measurements, the area of the square is 18,208 m^{2} (195,990 sq ft).

== Features ==
There are a total of 48 houses surrounding the square, 39 of which have an address on the square itself. The rest fall into the nearby streets.

=== Stray boulder ===
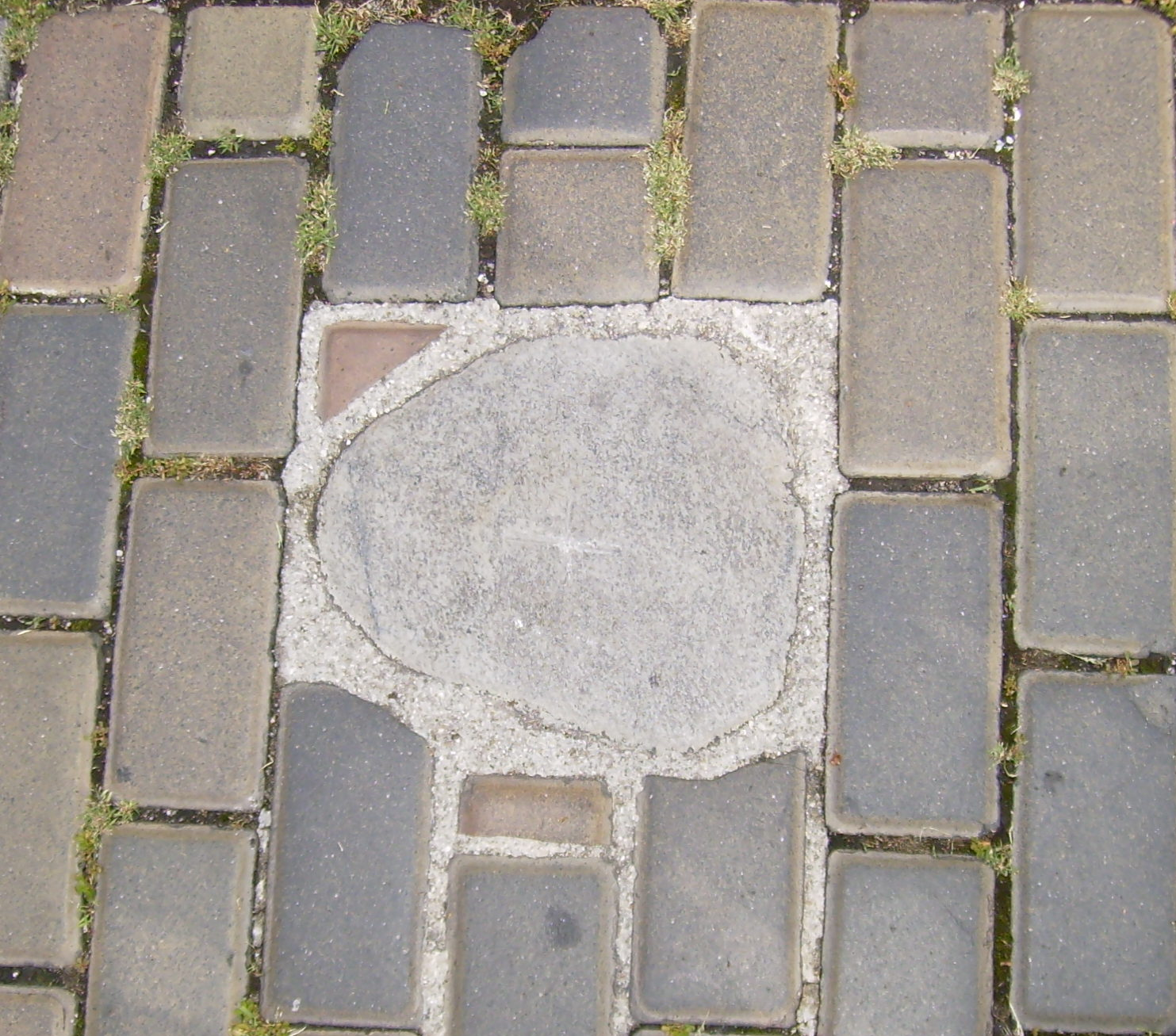
Stray boulder

An c. 30 cm large rounded boulder with an engraved cross lies in the southeastern part of the square within the regular ceramic pavement. According to legend, an executioner's log used to stand on this spot. In 1470 or 1478, ten young men suspected of murdering a reeve were reportedly executed here.

In 2010, a group of young men managed to dig up the boulder, they were caught in the act and arrested by the city police. Since then, for safety reasons, the boulder has been concreted in place.

=== Samson's Fountain ===
Today's dominant feature of the square, Samson's Fountain, was built in the 1720s in the middle of the square as part of the water supply system. On the southern corner of the western side of the square stands the City Hall, which was damaged by fires in 1641 and 1655. In 1727–1730, the new Baroque city hall was built by Anton Erhard Martinelli.

=== Western side ===
There are a total of 10 houses on the western side. In the southwest corner, the street Radniční enters the square from the west and Biskupská from the south.

St. No.	No.	Name	Photo	Description
1	1	City Hall	Radnice	Baroque building built in 1727–1730, along with No. 2, serves as the City Hall and City Council
2	2	New City Hall	Radnice	Former inn rebuilt in the Neoclassical style, it houses the official counters of the City Council.
3	6	Stoltz House		One of the oldest houses in the city, its current Neoclassical form comes from the 19th century.
4	7	The Golden Stag		House with a late Gothic core. According to an undocumented legend, Jan Žižka's brother was killed here.
5	8	Hansen House		Originally a Gothic house. Crowds of people used to stand in front of the house during various demonstrations during the socialist era.
6	10	Vogarelli House		Named after Vincenzo Vogarelli, one of three builders of the Black Tower.
7	11	The Black Bear		House with a Baroque façade and Gothic arcades.
8	12	Stehlíčků House		House with a Neoclassical façade and preserved gothic elements in its interior.
9	13	Petřík House		House with a Gothic core that was rebuilt in the Neoclassical style around 1820.
Piaristická 1	16	Mallner House		House with an Empire façade and Gothic core. The Gothic window between the arches of the arcade was restored during the reconstruction in 1994.

=== Northern side ===
There are a total of 13 houses on the northern side.

In the northwest corner, the street Piaristická enters the square from the west and Krajinská from the north.

St. No.	No.	Name	Photo	Description
Krajinská 2	36	Puklice House		The Art Nouveau house where portreeve Ondřej Puklice of Vztuhy was beaten to death in 1467.
10	39	Lampl House		Originally a Gothic, later a Renaissance house, rebuilt in the 19th century in the Neoclassical style.
11	41	The Roman Emperor		Renaissance house with a Baroque façade, a bust of the Roman emperor Trajan sits above the attic. The original sculpture by Josef Dietrich is exhibited in the Story of the City exhibition in the South Bohemian Museum.
12	42	The Blue Marksman		Originally a Gothic house, rebuilt in the Renaissance style and after 1934 rebuilt in its present form.
13	49	Daudlebský House		Gothic house with a preserved 16th century façade and original ceilings.
14	50	Metelec House		Originally a Gothic house rebuilt at the end of the 19th century in the Neoclassical style, including square columns with lintels in the cloister; partially demolished in 1984.
15	55	Čermák House		House with a Renaissance-Baroque façade and preserved Renaissance and Gothic elements, including a Gothic chapel. Between 1624 and 1627, the house was owned by Baltasar Marradas, who in 1627 gave it to Servatius della Fossa, son-in-law of the Mayor of České Budějovice, Kašpar Daudlebský, as a reward for his loyalty.
Plachého 1	56	Lukeš dům		The house was rebuilt in 1928 in modernist and art deco style. The Lukeš company, the largest clothing store in South Bohemia, was located here. In 1986, it was rebuilt in Renaissance style.
Plachého 2	57	The Three Red Crosses		House with three unequal cloisters. The passage of Plachý Street begins here.
16	58	Municipal House		Originally two Gothic houses, now rebuilt in the Neoclassical style.
17	67	Förster House		One of the oldest houses in the city (documented in 1380). It has a high hipped roof and a Renaissance gable.
18	68	Kolatschek House		(also Koláček House) is a house with a Renaissance façade in which fragments of Gothic windows and a stucco oval of an unidentified house sign have been preserved.
U Černé věže 1	69	Savings Bank		Functionalist house built in 1934–1936 on the site of the original Art Nouveau house, now the Česká spořitelna.

=== Eastern side ===
There are a total of 13 houses on the eastern side. In the northeast corner, the street U Černé Věže enters the square from the north and Kanovnická from the east.

St. No.	No.	Name	Photo	Description
Kanovnická 2	76	House of Theresa Förster		Originally a Gothic house with a Renaissance façade from 1565 and one arch of a cloister.
19	77	The Cavalryman of St. George		House with a Renaissance façade, one arch of a cloister is already documented in 1602.
20	78	The Red Stag		The house has a Renaissance façade, a Baroque gable and both Neoclassical and Baroque stuccoes.
21	79	The Golden Cellar		The house was rebuilt in the 18th century in Rococo style. In the cartouche is a kneeling monk with a skull at his feet.
22	80	The Golden Star		House with a late Baroque gable, which retains its Renaissance shape.
23	83	Knapp House		The house used to be structurally connected to the neighbouring house No. 24.
24	84	Haas House		The semi-detached house burnt down in 1641 and was rebuilt in Baroque style.
25	87	Bookstore		The original Gothic house burnt down in 1641 and was not repaired for many years. For over 90 years, the house has accommodated various bookstores.
26	88	Kollmann House (Pharmacy)		Originally a Gothic house, last rebuilt at the turn of the 19th and 20th centuries.
27	89	The Three Roosters		Art Nouveau building built in 1903–1906. Part of Grandhotel Zvon.
28	90	The Silver Bell		The original two Gothic houses were merged into one in the 16th century, later rebuilt in Baroque style, the Baroque elements were removed in the 19th century. Part of Grandhotel Zvon.
29	91	Ausobský House		Classical house with a preserved Gothic-Renaissance core. Part of Grandhotel Zvon.
Karla IV. 1	92	Bee Palace		The house was built in 1895–1896 for the German money institution Spar und Vorschussverein Biene, Czech for Bee Savings and Loan Association. The bee and hive ornaments are meant to symbolize frugality.

=== Southern side ===
There are a total of 13 houses on the southern side. In the southeast corner, the street Karla IV. enters the square from the east and Dr. Stejskala from the south.

St. No.	No.	Name	Photo	Description
Dr. Stejskala 2	113	The (White) Stag		Renaissance house with an Empire façade until 1998. In 1998, a Renaissance sgraffito with a stag was revealed.
30	114	The White Angel		Renaissance house with a Gothic core. In 1911, a treasure trove of gold and silver coins was discovered during the renovation of the house.
31	115	Kratochwil Publishing		Renaissance house, modified in the 1920s, the floor was planted on a cantilever in the form of owls.
32	117	The Book		Renaissance house, rebuilt in Baroque style and modified at the end of the 19th century. The cross ridge vault in the cloister has been preserved.
33	118	Erben House		Renaissance house, modified in Baroque style, preserved Rococo stucco.
34	121	The White Swan		Gothic house with Renaissance façade. In 1967, the first wooden Gothic ceiling in the town was uncovered.
35	122	Wicht House		The Renaissance house was rebuilt after a fire in 1968, the next reconstruction was in 1929, when, despite a building permit, only one arch of the cloister was built instead of the prescribed two.
36	123	Čertík House		The originally Gothic house burnt down in 1868. After the fire it was repaired in a mixture of styles. At the beginning of the 1990s the then owner, Čedok, wanted to rebuild it. The houses and the neighboring Hotel Slunce were demolished down to the façade and subsequently only the façade remained for 8 years.
37		Hotel Slunce (Dvořák)		Hotel Dvořák and Gallery Dvořák since 2001.
38	127	The House of Art		The Neoclassical Gothic-Renaissance house has been owned by the city or a state institution since 1761.
39	128	Čedok		After a fire in 1868, it was rebuilt in a historicist style, and was adapted to its present Baroque form in 1983–1987.
Biskupská 1	129	Old Post		In the years 1782–1918 the post office and telegraph office were located here, the telephone and telegraph remained here until 1922/3.
