= Black Tower =

Black Tower may refer to:

== Constructions ==
- Black Tower (Brașov), a 15th-century guard tower in Braşov, Romania, used today as a museum.
- Black Tower (Brussels), a 13th-century medieval tower, notable for being one single medieval tower, standing amidst the modern day buildings of Brussels, Belgium.
- Black Tower (České Budějovice), or Černá věž, a well-known 16th-century tower in České Budějovice, Czech Republic.
- Black Tower, a tower in the Norwich city walls.

== Arts and entertainment ==
- The Black Tower (James novel), a 1975 detective novel by P. D. James
- The Black Tower (Lupoff novel), a 1988 novel by Richard A. Lupoff
- The Black Tower (TV serial), a 1985 British drama based on the novel by PD James
- The Black Tower (Midkemia Press), a 1981 fantasy role-playing game supplement published by Midkemia Press
- Headquarters for the Asha'man in Robert Jordan's Wheel of Time fictional universe
