= Ivana Červenková =

Czech diplomat

Consul General of the Czech Republic in Munich
- Incumbent
- Assumed office 2022

Ambassador of the Czech Republic to Austria
- In office January 2018 – 2 June 2021
- Preceded by: Jan Sechter
- Succeeded by: Jiří Šitler

Personal details
- Born: February 12, 1962 (age 64) České Budějovice, Czechoslovakia
- Education: Charles University (Faculty of Law)
- Occupation: Diplomat

Ivana Červenková (born 12 February 1962) is a Czech diplomat. Since 2022, She has been serving as Consul General at the Consulate General of the Czech Republic in Munich.

== Biography ==
Červenková was born on 12 February 1962 in České Budějovice, Czechoslovakia. She graduated from the Faculty of Law of Charles University in 1984.

During her career as a diplomat, she was Chargé d'affaires at the Czech embassy in Vienna from 2012 until 2013 and Deputy Ambassador from 2010 until 2014. From 2018 to 2021, she served as the Czech Ambassador to Austria.
