= Anna Binder-Urbanová =

Czech philologist and philanthropist (1912–2004)

Anna Binder-Urbanová (21 June 1912 – 16 May 2004) was a Czech lecturer in modern philosophy and philology. She was recognized as a Righteous Among the Nations due to her activities in World War II. During the Holocaust, she helped smuggle Jews who had worked in the underground, and rescued several Jewish women from the Auschwitz extermination camp.

== Early life ==
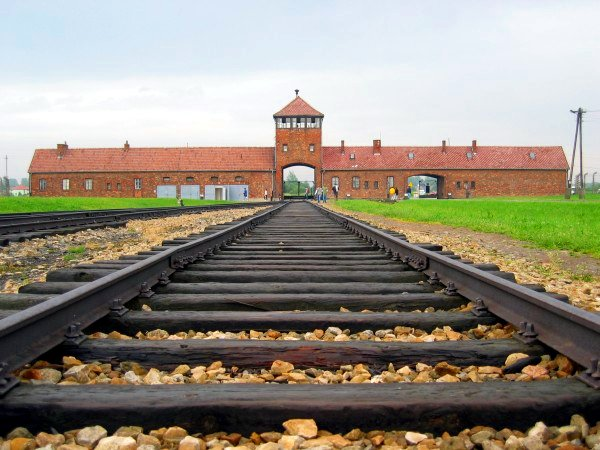
Auschwitz extermination camp

Anna Binder-Urbanová was born on 21 June 1912 in České Budějovice in southern Bohemia, to a German-Czech family. She graduated from a German real gymnasium in 1931. Due to the deteriorating financial situation of her family, she was unable to continue her studies at the university and began earning a living by teaching private language lessons. In 1936, she was hired by the Czechoslovak Foreign Ministry, thanks to her knowledge of many foreign languages (English, French and Italian), in addition to her two native languages – Czech and German. This job gave her the right to hold a diplomatic passport. At the end of 1938, she was dismissed from her government workplace and began making a living from private language lessons for refugees who had found temporary retreat in Czechoslovakia, including Jews.

== Activities during WWII to rescue Jews ==
Binder-Urbanová, who was interested in philology, literature, music and art, was suddenly confronted with the racism and the violence of WWII. She gave her passport, which she had received from the Czechoslovak Foreign Ministry, to people who worked in the underground along with her Aryan lineage certificate, which she had obtained specifically for this purpose.

She hid Jewish fortunes and helped transfer them abroad. Among others she transferred jewels of one of her students to Switzerland in 1938. As a result, she and her sister were arrested in 1940 for concealing Jewish fortune. In 1941, Binder-Urbanová was arrested by the Gestapo along with her husband Harry Epstein (Jindřich Epstein) - a Jewish doctor, following her anti-fascist activities. She was sent to the Ravensbrück women's concentration camp.

At the end of March 1942, Binder-Urbanová was included in the first group of a thousand German women, who were sent from Ravensbrück to Auschwitz to serve as pioneers in the women's camp, which was about to open in the camp grounds. At first, her job was to register the inmates who came to Auschwitz - Jewish women from Czechoslovakia. After a few weeks Binder-Urbanová was promoted to be the secretary of Dr. Joachim Caesar, who was the head of the agricultural enterprises division in Auschwitz and had a special status in the camp.

In order to set up the experimental agricultural station, which Binder-Urbanová's administration was responsible for, Binder-Urbanová was tasked to find suitable labor forces among the camp inmates who knew German. As part of her mission Binder-Urbanová chose women who were not needed and they were destined for execution and thus she saved them. The working conditions under Binder-Urbanová were better than the conditions elsewhere. Binder-Urbanová was not content with advertising and comforting the suffering women. She helped the inmates forget a little about their suffering and humiliation and gave them strength and hope while risking her own life. Binder-Urbanová organized lectures, group discussions and private lessons in different languages for all Jewish women. In that way, Binder-Urbanová became a source of inspiration and her behavior also influenced the other Aryan women who lived with the Jews.

In the fall of 1942, the Auschwitz women's camp was transported to Birkenau. The camp administration decided to return all the women who had worked with the S.S commanders back to Auschwitz in order to prevent their contagion of diseases that were spread in Birkenau. When the working female prisoners were back in Auschwitz, they were housed together (thanks to Binder-Urbanová), Aryans and Jews, in a basement that was called "Stabsgebäude".

One year later, in the fall of 1943, a young Jewish Czechoslovak woman who had worked with Binder-Urbanová was arrested, after she was caught corresponding with a Polish prisoner. Binder-Urbanová understood what the young woman's punishment would be and thus she asked her work manager, Joachim Caesar, to interfere on behalf of the young woman and help her. Joachim Caesar advised her to stop standing up for the Jewish women and to be cautious with her behavior.

After the young woman's case, Binder-Urbanová's position deteriorated. The S.S commanders did not take Binder-Urbanová's relationships with the prisoners kindly and she was dismissed from her job. In addition, she was sent to the oubliette for seven days after she was caught holding a lighter. Binder-Urbanová understood her situation and she decided to write letters and send presents to her female friends from work, but she was caught again (now by her new manager). Binder-Urbanová was concerned that her friends would get punished because of her letters and presents, so she offered her manager to leave the camp and go to Birkenau if he would not report her actions. Her manager agreed and in January 1944, she left Auschwitz and was deported to Birkenau camp.

In Birkenau, Binder-Urbanová was sent to the penal battalion and worked in a unit that paved roads. She was highly guarded and was distanced from Jews. Due to her hard job, she got sick and was directed to the camp's hospital, where her friends took care of her and later on found her a new job as a clerk. She could not stay in her job for long and thus she was transported back to Ravensbrück camp and later to Kraslice (Graslitz) camp.

== Life after the war ==
Binder-Urbanová managed to escape Kraslice camp and returned back to Prague. There, she reconnected with her husband Dr. Epstein and they had three children. She continued with her academic studies and completed her PhD degree in modern philology and philosophy, and became a lecturer in Prague university. In addition, Binder-Urbanová was also a member of "Universum" in a Czech literature and art class.

== Honors ==
Binder-Urbanová was recognized by Yad Vashem institute as a Righteous Among the Nations on 28 June 1967. Her name was engraved in the honor wall at the garden of the Righteous Among the Nations in Yad Vashem, and a tree was planted there in her honor.
