= St. Catherine of Boletice =

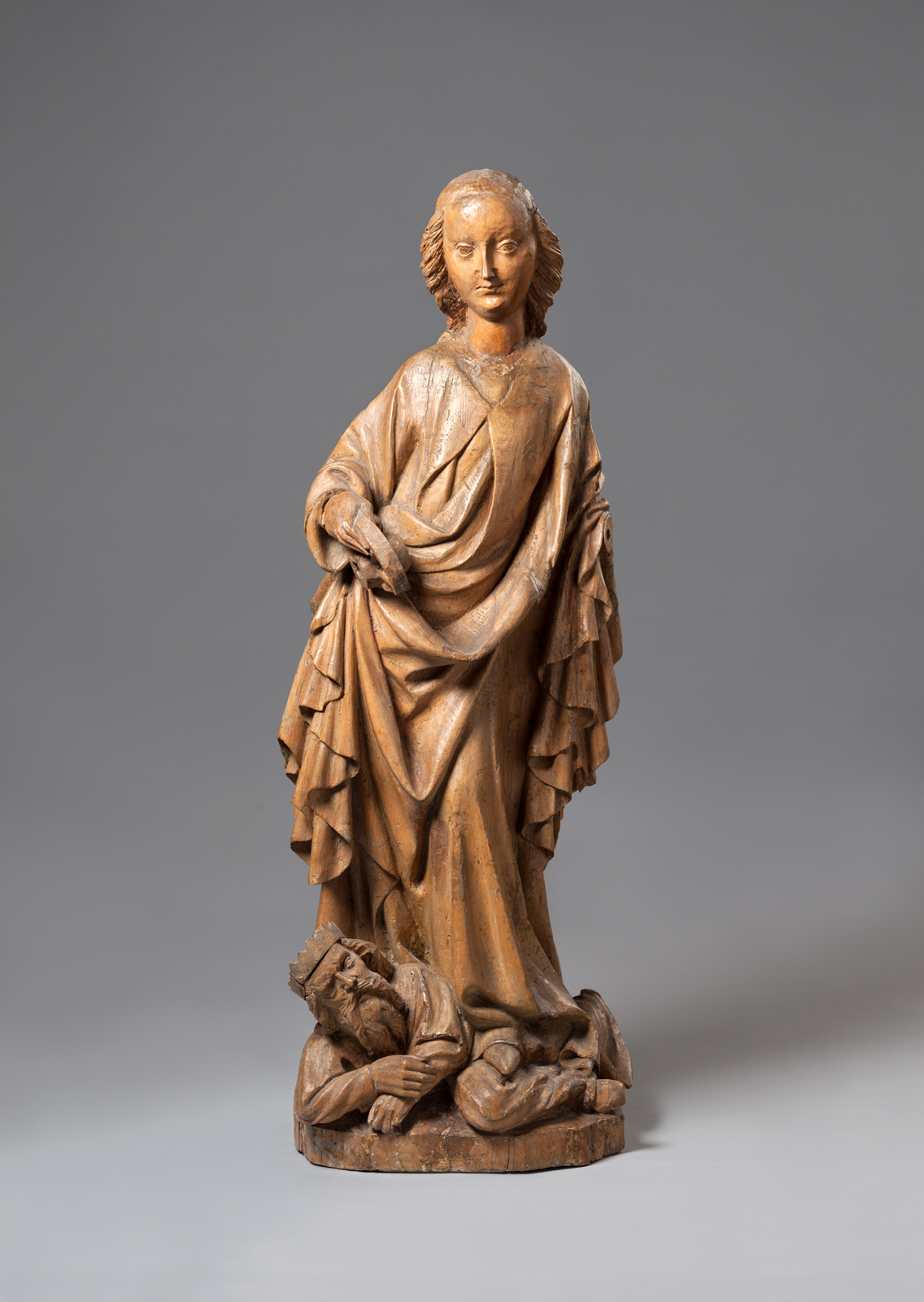
St. Catherine of Boletice (1400-1410), Aleš South Bohemian Gallery in Hluboká nad Vltavou

St. Catherine of Boletice is an excellent carving from the late phase of the Beautiful style (1400-1410), which comes from a Prague workshop. It is on display in the permanent exhibition of the Aleš South Bohemian Gallery in Hluboká nad Vltavou.

== History ==
The statue of St. Catherine of Alexandria was found in the sacristy of the Church of St. Nicholas in Boletice, from where it was acquired by the Diocesan Museum in České Budějovice. As part of this collection it was transferred to the Museum of Homeland History in České Budějovice and in 1953 to the Aleš South Bohemian Gallery in Hluboká nad Vltavou.

== Description and classification ==
Fully carved sculpture made of lime wood with remnants of original polychrome and gilding, height 81 cm. Restored by Bohuslav Slánský (1947).

The body of the saint is strongly S-curved and her left leg with indicated knee and an extended toe is standing on the reclining figure of Emperor Maxentius. The tails of her cloak, clasped at the breast, are draped over both forearms, forming bowl-like folds in front and long tubular cascades at the sides. The greater part of the left arm is missing. The motif of the cloak pressed against the right elbow is identical in most of the statues related to the Krumlov Madonna circle. On the back of the statue, the drapery forms long vertical folds interrupted by two bowl-shaped folds on the left side. Catherine clutches a wheel in her right hand as an attribute of her martyrdom and stands triumphantly on the tiny figure of the Emperor Maxentius, who, according to Christian legend, had her martyred. The high-fronted head has indentations on the back that held the now missing crown.

The statue came from a Prague workshop where it was carved between 1400 and 1410. According to Clasen, the author may have been the carver who created the statue of St. Catherine for Karlštejn Castle. The composition is based on older models (St. Catherine of Jihlava, the Krumlov Madonna). Some art historians see in this work a schematization and ornamentation of the adopted formal features and a loss of sensual charm. The execution corresponds to a later phase of the so-called Beautiful Style, characterized by stylized and richly pleated drapery and an idealized face.

== Sources ==
- Record Sheet, Inv. no. P-14, Aleš South Bohemian Gallery in Hluboká nad Vltavou
- Hynek Látal, Petra Lexová, Martin Vaněk, Meziprůzkumy, AJG Collection 1300-2016, No. 9, AJG Hluboká nad Vltavou 2016, ISBN 978-80-87799-52-9
- Roman Lavička, Gothic Art, Aleš South Bohemian Gallery 2008, pp. 16-17, ISBN 978-80-86952-57-4
- Hynek Rulíšek, Gothic Art of South Bohemia, Guide, vol. 3, Aleš South Bohemian Gallery in Hluboká nad Vltavou 1989, ISBN 80-900057-6-4
- Hynek Rulíšek, Gothic Art in South Bohemia, National Gallery in Prague 1989, ISBN 80-7035-013-X
- Jan Müller, South Bohemian sculpture of the late beautiful style 1420-1470, diploma. Thesis, Charles University Prague, 1975
- Karl Heinz Clasen, Der Meister der Schönen Madonnen, Berlin 1974
- Vladimír Denkstein, The Beautiful Madonna of Zbiroh. Proceedings of the Faculty of Arts, Brno University, Art History Series, F 16, Brno 1972
- Jaromír Homolka, K problematice české plastiky 1350-1420, Umění XI, 1963
- Albert Kutal, Czech Gothic Sculpture 1350-1450, Prague 1962
