= Otto Pilny =

Swiss Orientalist painter

- Born: 28 June 1866; České Budějovice, Austrian Empire
- Died: 22 July 1936 (aged 70); Zürich, Switzerland
- Known for: Painting
- Movement: Orientalist themes

Otto Pilny (28 June 1866 – 22 July 1936) was a Czech-Swiss painter who specialized in Orientalist genre scenes.

== Life and career ==
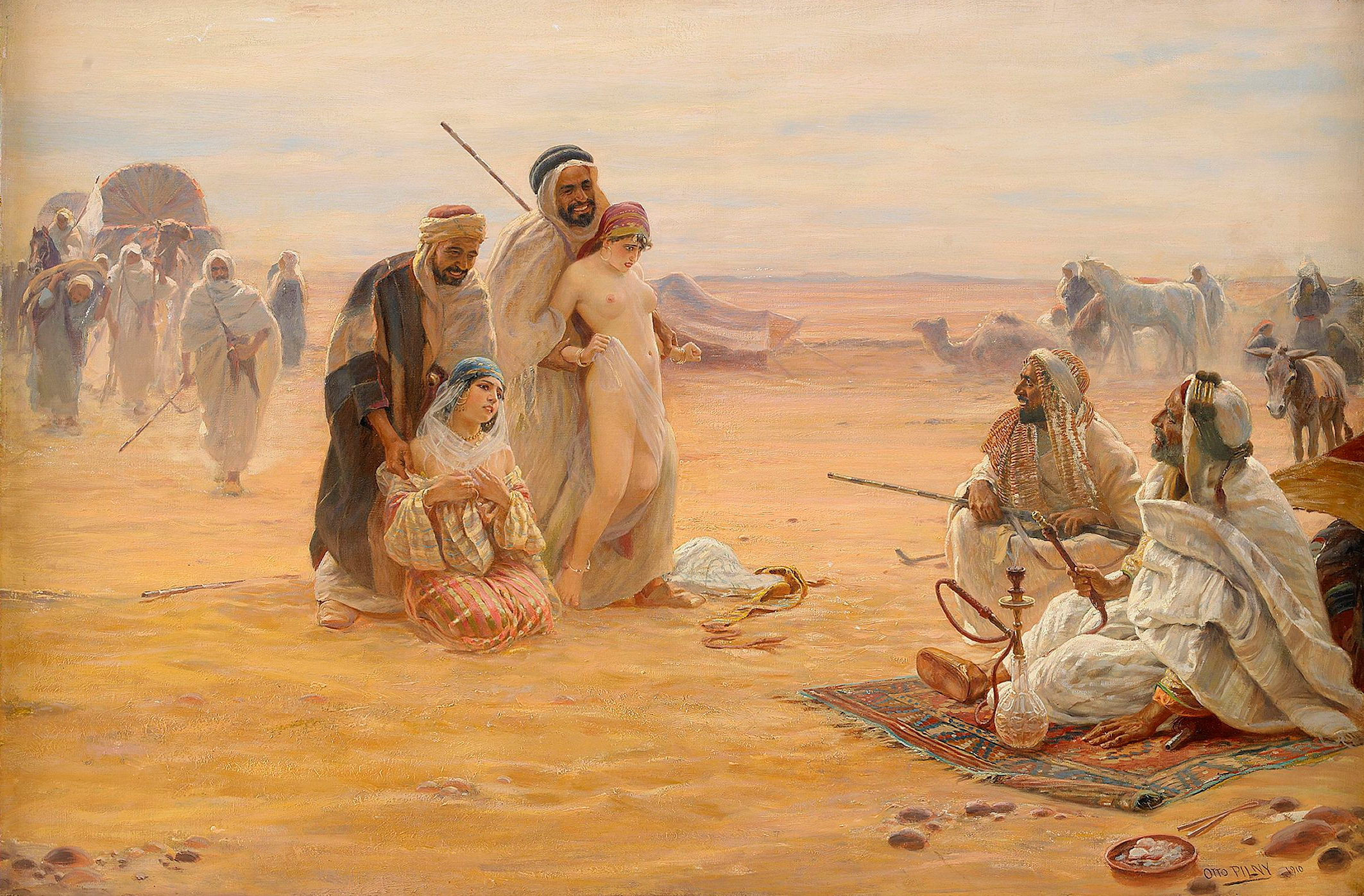
The Slave Market (1910)

Born in České Budějovice on 28 June 1866, his family moved to Prague in 1873, and he presumably received his artistic education there; but the details are unknown. He took his first painting trip to the Orient when he was nineteen, and travelled the caravan route from Cairo to Tripoli, accompanied only by his dog. After a brief stay in Prague, he was back in Egypt from 1889 to 1892.

Following a short stay in Vienna, probably to continue his studies, he moved to Zürich in 1895, married and received Swiss citizenship. His first exhibition was in 1900. While in Egypt his work had pleased the Ottoman authorities in Egypt and he was appointed a Court Painter. In 1906, the last Khedive, Abbas Hilmi II awarded him the Order of the Medjidie, 4th class.

Like many of his contemporaries, Pilny was captivated by the North African landscape, people as well as their customs. He was particularly interested in the Bedouins and often travelled with them into the desert where he could sketch the evening entertainments. His experiences in North Africa provided the inspiration for his paintings for the rest of his life, and he was one of only a few Orientalist painters who depicted Muslims in prayer.

Pilny died in 1936 in Zürich. His son, Otto Alexander (22 March 1897 – 17 March 1958) was also a painter of Zürich, but specialized in vedute. His works have often been incorrectly attributed to his father.

== Select list of paintings ==
- View of the El Mnayyad Mosque, Cairo (1897)
- Trade in the Desert (1913)
- Exotic Oriental Beauty (1917)
- Muslim Morning Prayers
- Tambourine Dancer
- Prayer in the Desert
- Evening Prayers
- Oriental Street Scene
- The Desert Dance
- A Rest in the Desert
- Dance of the Seven Veils

== Gallery ==
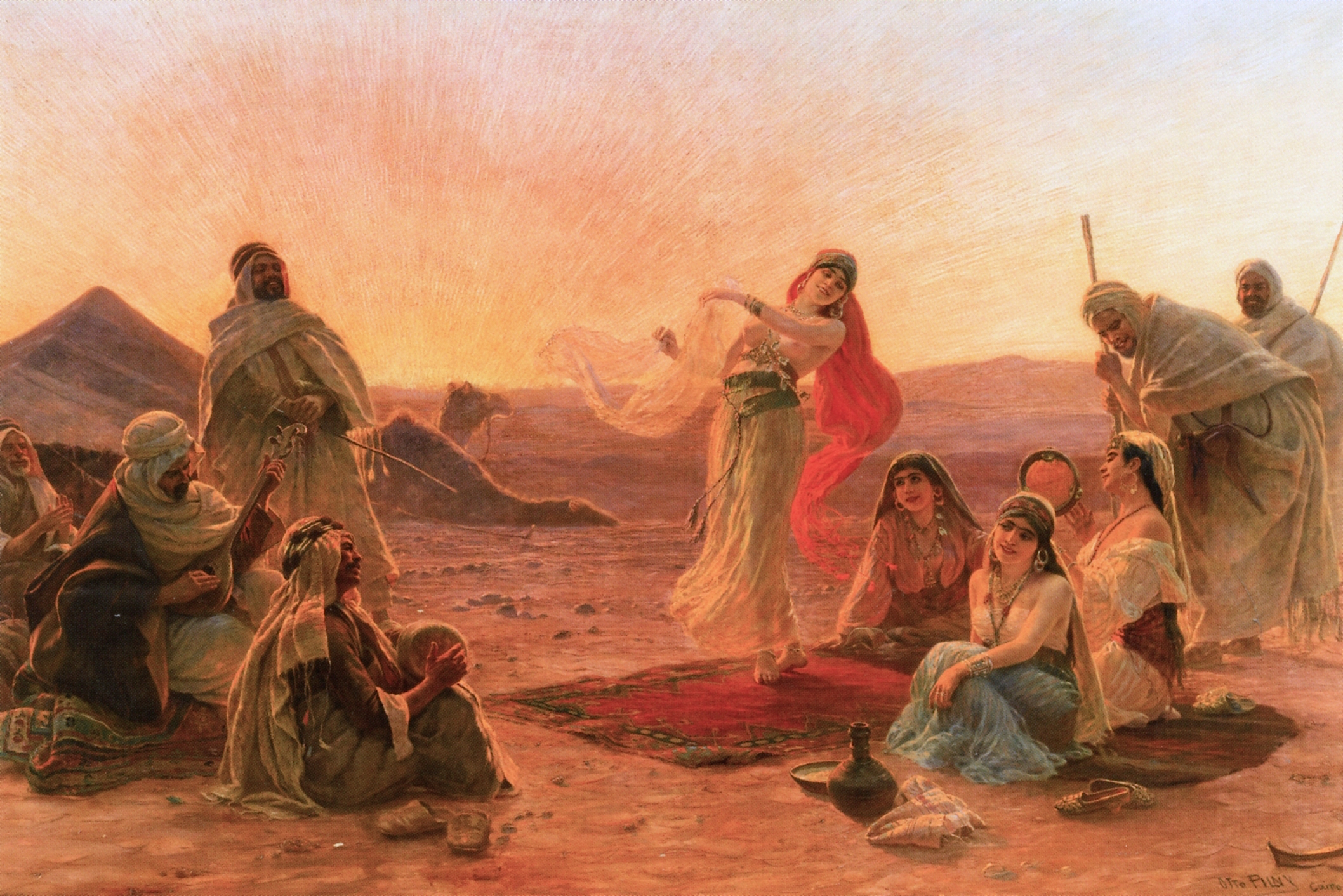
Dancing at Sunset

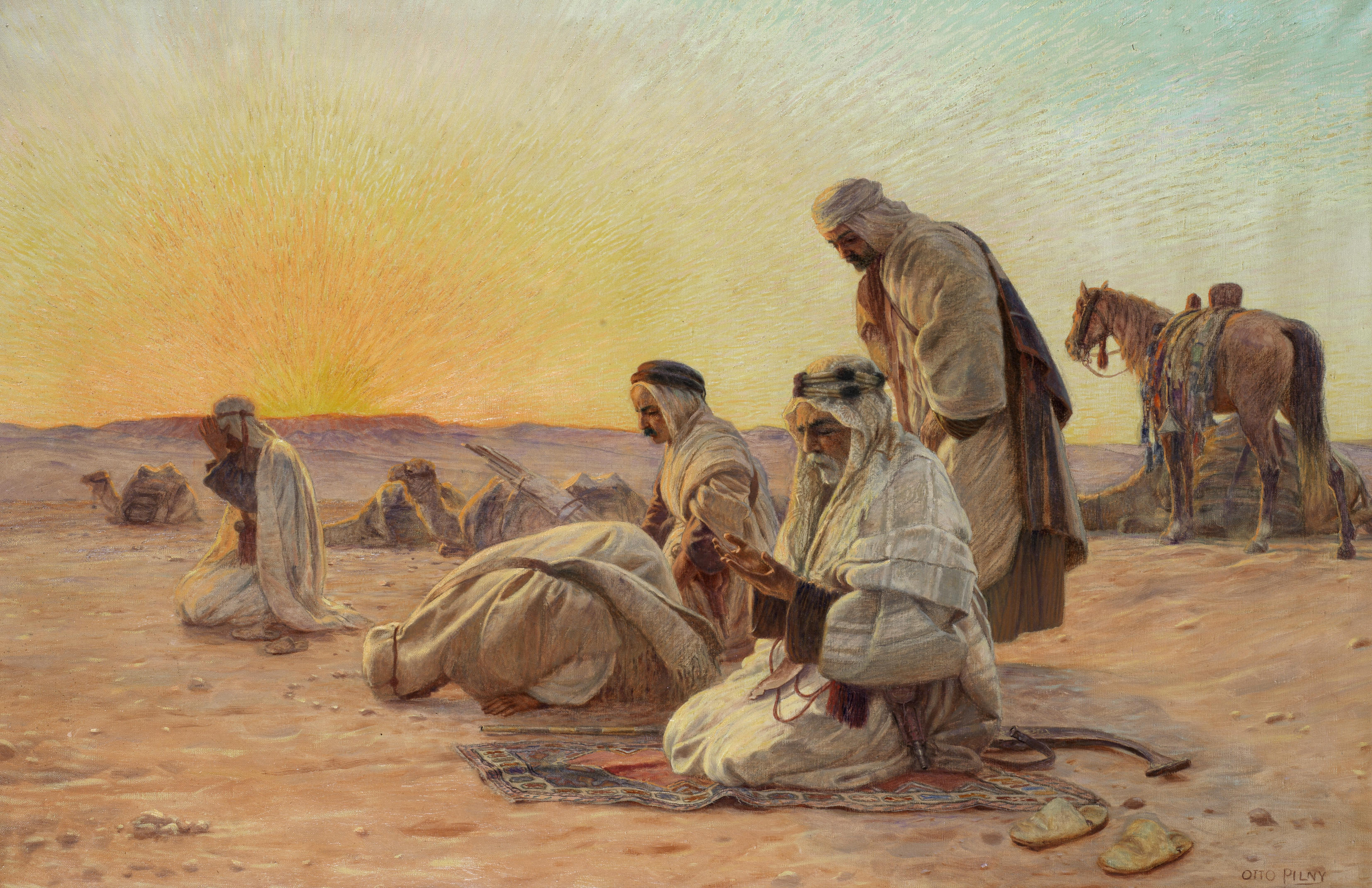
Morning Prayers

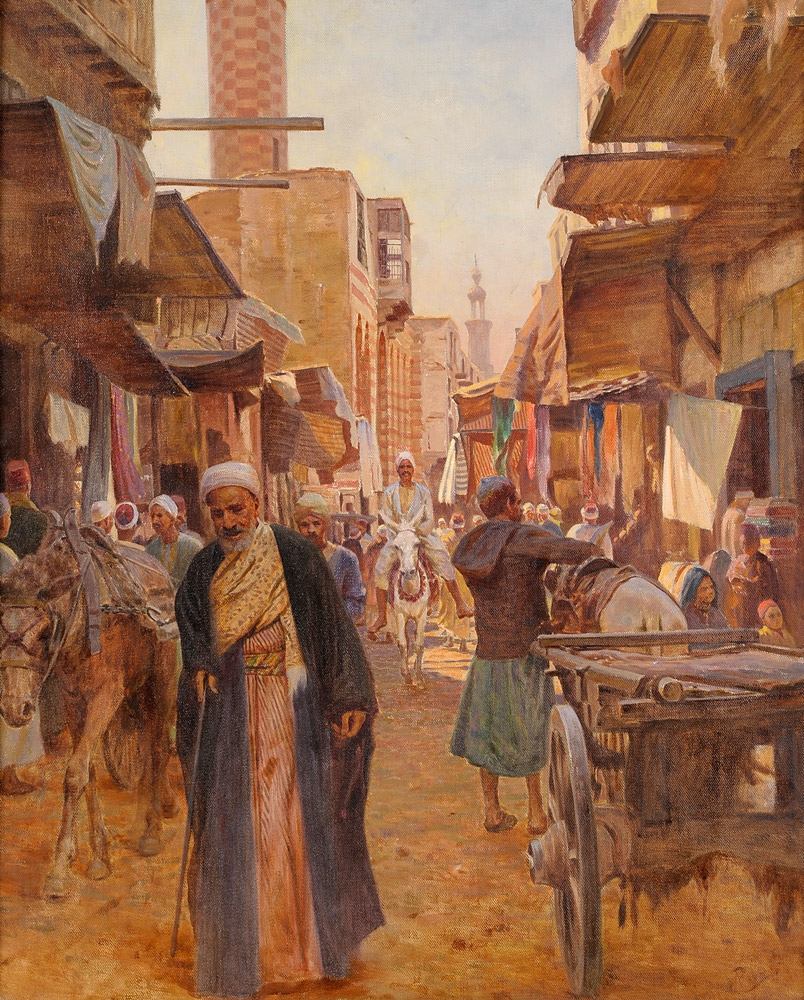
Oriental Bazaar

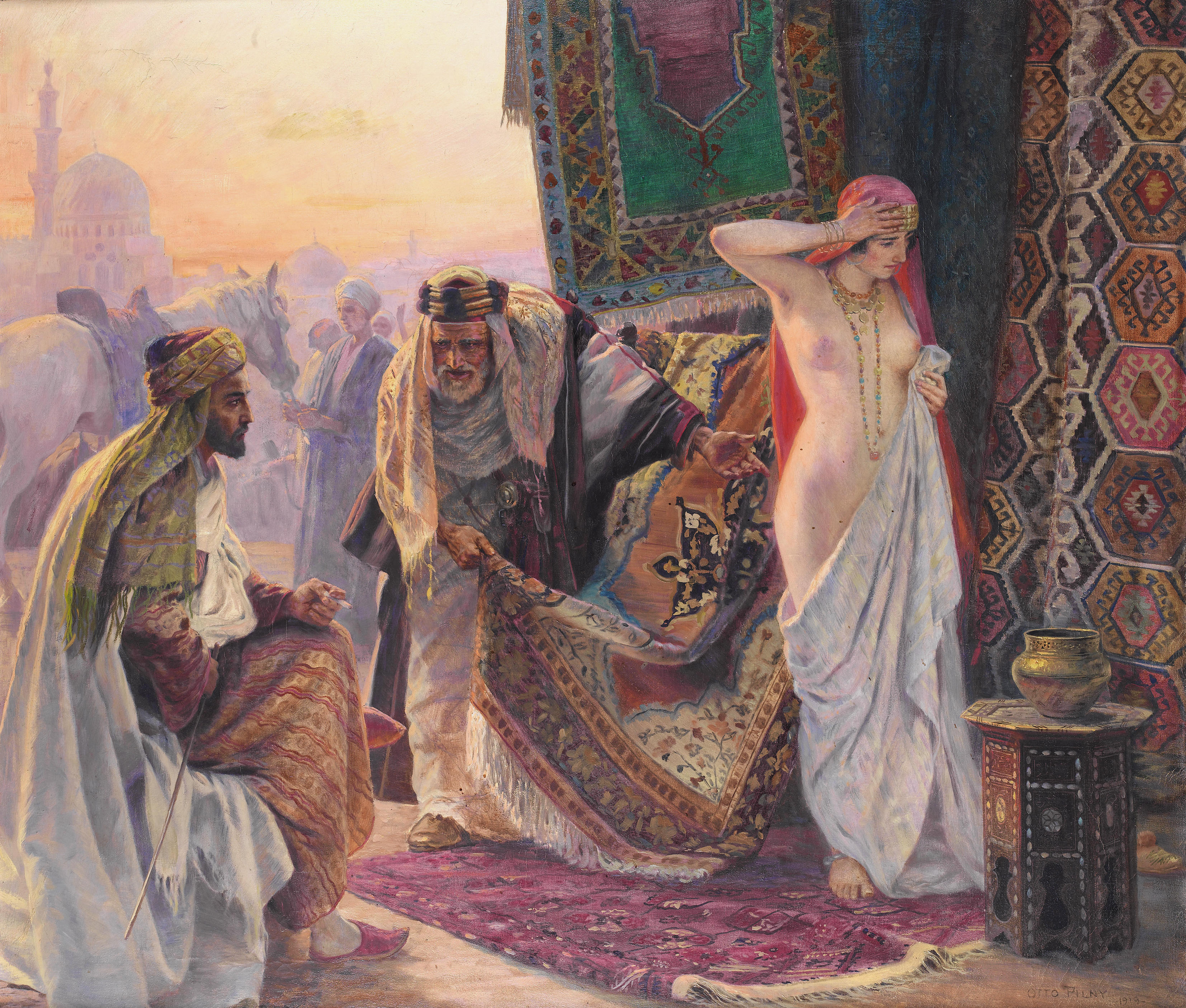
Slave Dealer (1919)
