= Litvínovice =

- Municipality
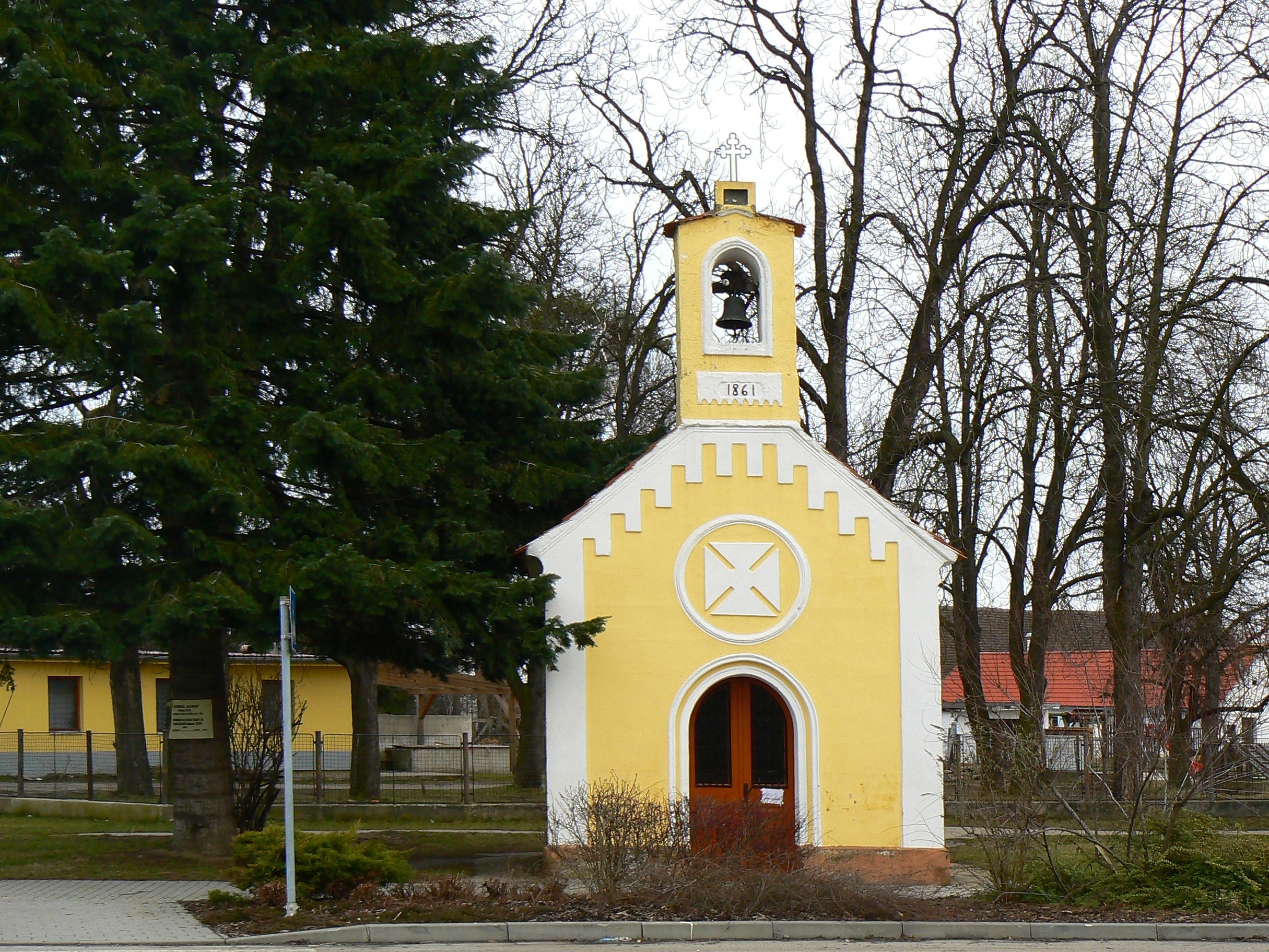
- Chapel

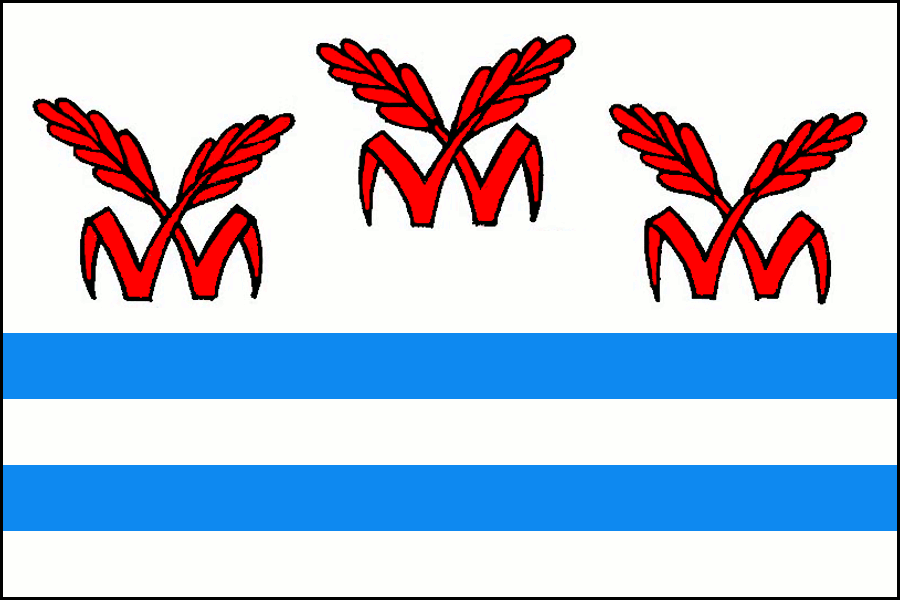
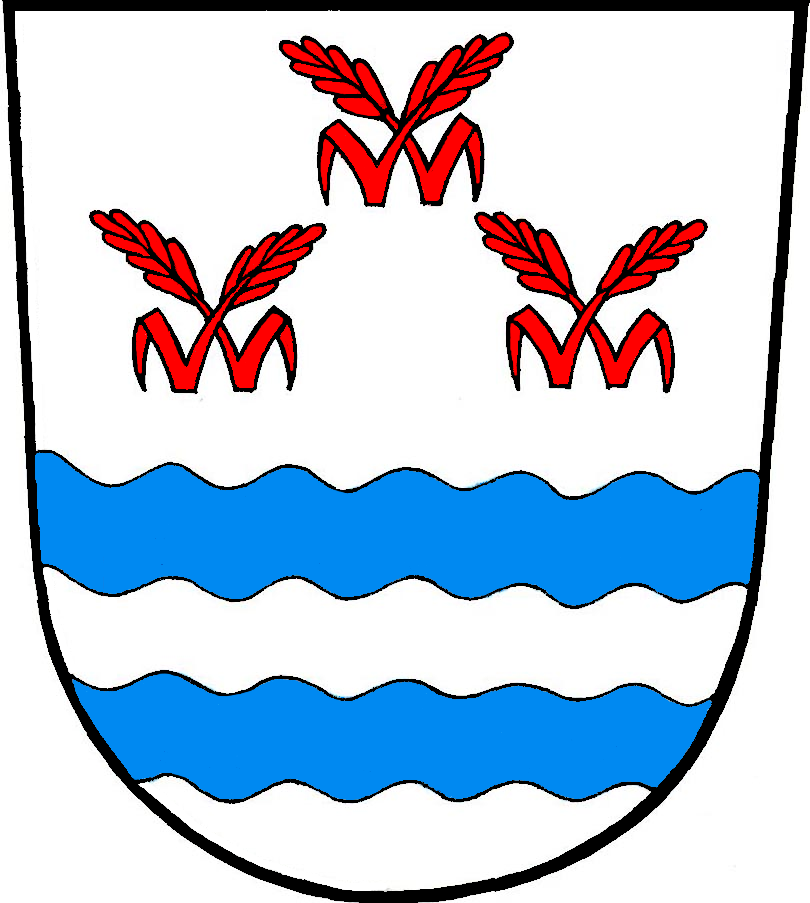
- Flag Coat of arms

- Location in the Czech Republic
- Coordinates: 48°57′44″N 14°27′5″E
- Country: Czech Republic
- Region: South Bohemian
- District: České Budějovice
- First mentioned: 1259

Area
  - Total: 5.82 km^{2} (2.25 sq mi)
- Elevation: 389 m (1,276 ft)

Population (2026-01-01)
  - Total: 2,782
  - Density: 478/km^{2} (1,240/sq mi)
- Time zone: UTC+1 (CET)
  - Summer (DST): UTC+2 (CEST)
- Postal code: 370 01
- Website: www.litvinovice.cz

Litvínovice (German: Leitnowitz) is a municipality and village in České Budějovice District in the South Bohemian Region of the Czech Republic. It has about 2,800 inhabitants.

== Administrative division ==
Litvínovice consists of three municipal parts (in brackets population according to the 2021 census):

- Litvínovice (1,207)
- Mokré (614)
- Šindlovy Dvory (829)

== Etymology ==
The initial name of Litvínovice was Lutvínovice. It was derived from the personal name Lutvín, meaning "the village of Lutvín's people".

== Geography ==
Litvínovice is located about 1 kilometre (1 mi) west of České Budějovice. It lies in the České Budějovice Basin. The highest point is at 458 m (1,503 ft) above sea level. In the centre of the village is a system of fishponds, supplied by a short stream called Litvínovický potok.

On 11 February 1929, the lowest temperature ever in the Czech Republic and Czechoslovakia of -42.2 °C was recorded in Litvínovice.

== History ==
The first written mention of Litvínovice is in a deed of Vok I of Rosenberg from 1259.

== Demographics ==
Historical population

Year	Pop.	±%
1869	546	—
1880	566	+3.7%
1890	684	+20.8%
1900	704	+2.9%
1910	937	+33.1%

Year	Pop.	±%
1921	824	−12.1%
1930	910	+10.4%
1950	764	−16.0%
1961	921	+20.5%
1970	858	−6.8%

Year	Pop.	±%
1980	821	−4.3%
1991	854	+4.0%
2001	1,107	+29.6%
2011	2,215	+100.1%
2021	2,650	+19.6%

Source: Censuses

== Transport ==
The I/3 road (part of the European route E55), specifically the section from České Budějovice to the Czech–Austrian border in Dolní Dvořiště, runs through the municipality.

== Sights ==
There are two protected cultural monuments in the municipality: a stone niche chapel from 1834 and a water tank from 1875.
