= Matthias Kalina von Jäthenstein =

Czech lawyer, naturalist and archaeologist (1772–1848)

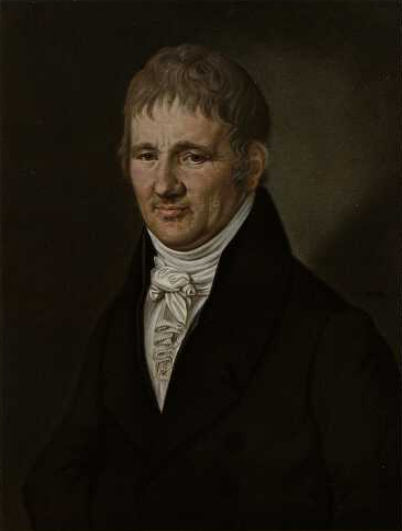
Matyáš Kalina of Jäthenstein in 1830

Johann Matthias Ritter Kalina von Jäthenstein (Czech: Matyáš Kalina z Jäthensteinu; 10 January 1772 – 6 January 1848) was a Czech noble, lawyer, naturalist and archaeologist. He was the dean of the Faculty of Law at Charles Ferdinand University. He has been considered as a founder of Czech and Bohemian archaeology.

== Life ==
Kalina was born in a noble family in České Budějovice where his father was a council member who had taken the title Jäthenstein from his wife. After studies at the local grammar school, he went to Charles Ferdinand University in Prague. He received a law degree in 1787 and a doctorate in law in 1796. He became a lecturer in the law faculty in 1800 and became dean in 1819. He also served as an attorney until 1845. From 1828, he was a member of the Czech Patriotic and Economic Society. In his spare time, he examined the archaeological finds of Bohemia and compiled a map. He managed his home estate at Zvíkovec and from 1834 he was a member of the society of the national museum.

He gave lectures on archaeology and in 1835 and was among the first to use chemical techniques to study archaeological remains. He also took an interest in the natural sciences, studying agriculture, particularly potato farming, and silkworm cultivation. As a philanthropist he worked for improving the standards of elementary school education.
