= Homole (České Budějovice District) =

- Municipality
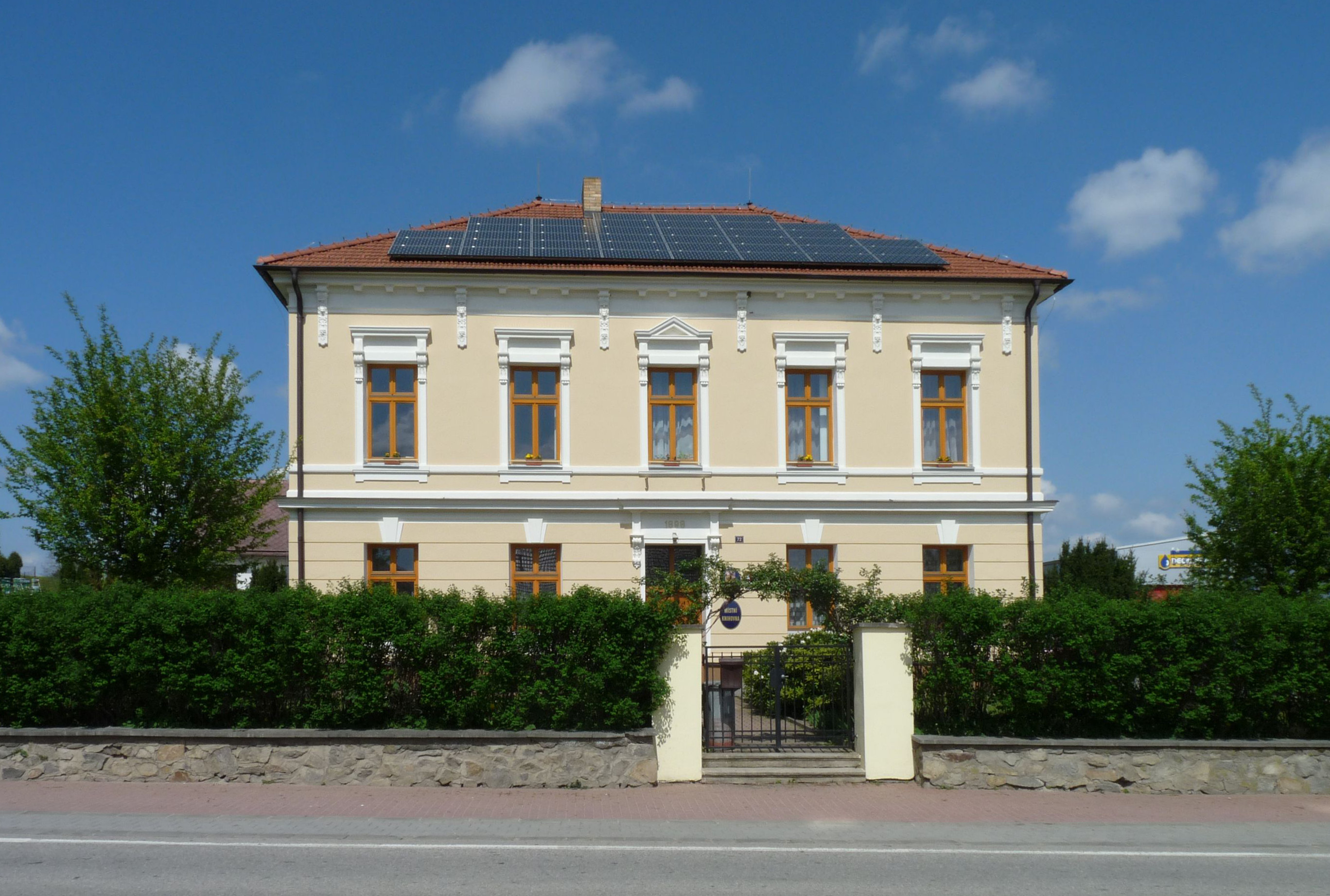
- Municipal office

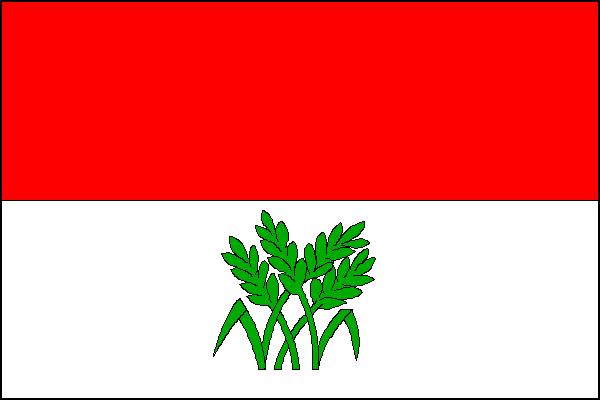
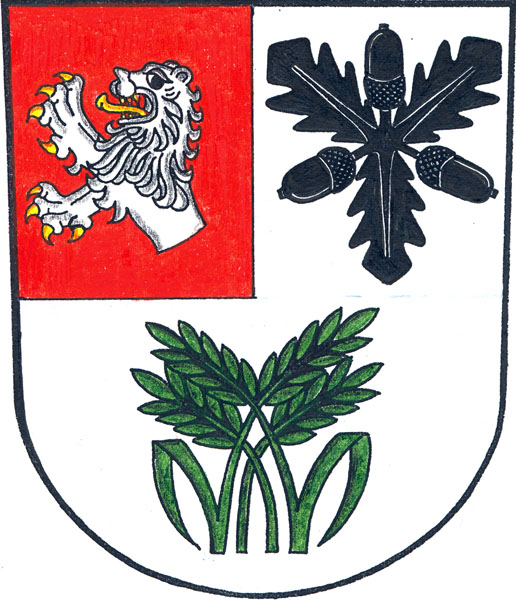
- Flag Coat of arms

- Location in the Czech Republic
- Coordinates: 48°56′20″N 14°25′46″E
- Country: Czech Republic
- Region: South Bohemian
- District: České Budějovice
- First mentioned: 1362

Area
  - Total: 10.95 km^{2} (4.23 sq mi)
- Elevation: 420 m (1,380 ft)

Population (2026-01-01)
  - Total: 1,727
  - Density: 157.7/km^{2} (408.5/sq mi)
- Time zone: UTC+1 (CET)
  - Summer (DST): UTC+2 (CEST)
- Postal code: 373 82
- Website: www.homole.cz

Homole (German: Hummeln) is a municipality and village in České Budějovice District in the South Bohemian Region of the Czech Republic. It has about 1,700 inhabitants.

Homole lies approximately 6 kilometres (4 mi) south-west of České Budějovice and 128 km (80 mi) south of Prague.

== Administrative division ==
Homole consists of three municipal parts (in brackets population according to the 2021 census):

- Homole (524)
- Černý Dub (250)
- Nové Homole (902)

== Demographics ==
Historical population
Year	Pop.	±%
1869	510	—
1880	595	+16.7%
1890	601	+1.0%
1900	656	+9.2%
1910	678	+3.4%
1921	685	+1.0%
1930	674	−1.6%
1950	1,425	+111.4%
1961	683	−52.1%
1970	648	−5.1%
1980	768	+18.5%
1991	748	−2.6%
2001	827	+10.6%
2011	1,326	+60.3%
2021	1,676	+26.4%
Source: Censuses
