= Radek Mynář =

Czech footballer (born 1974)

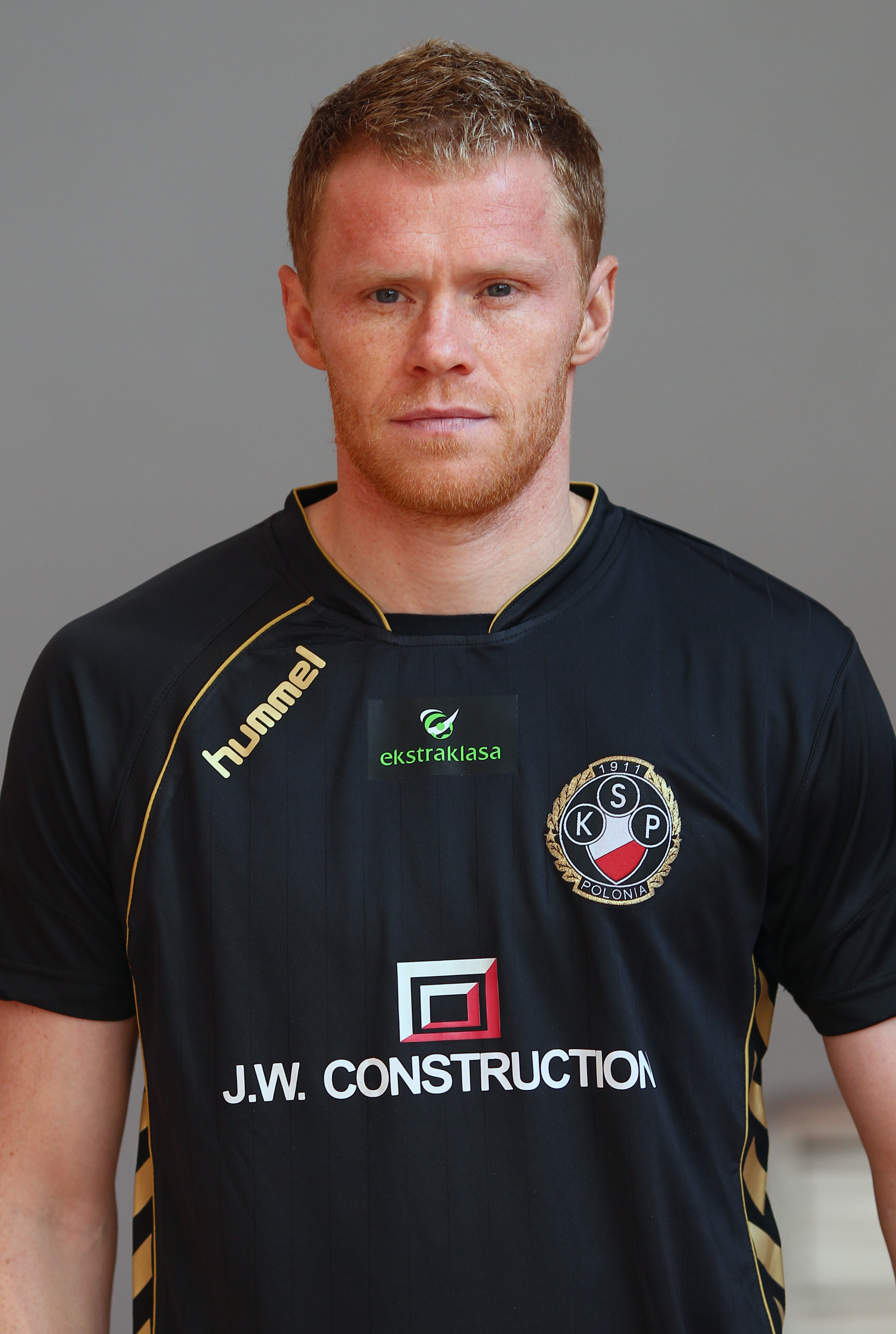
- Mynář in 2011

Personal information
- Date of birth: 22 November 1974 (age 51)
- Place of birth: Česká Lípa, Czechoslovakia
- Height: 1.77 m (5 ft 10 in)
- Position: Defender

Team information
- Current team: SK Rejšice

Senior career*
Years	Team	Apps	(Gls)
- Vagónka Česká Lípa
- Sokol Bolevec-Plzeň
- Hasit Horažďovice
1997–2000	Dukla Příbram	58	(6)
2000	Marila Příbram	5	(0)
2001–2003	Sparta Prague	21	(2)
2003–2008	Dyskobolia Grodzisk	92	(3)
2008–2012	Polonia Warsaw	73	(2)
2012–2015	Sokol Dlouhá Lhota		
2016	Lehner Oed/Zeillern		
2016–2018	FC Horky nad Jizerou		
2018	Union Saxen		
2018–2022	Horky nad Jizerou		
2022–	SK Rejšice		
- * Club domestic league appearances and goals as of 22 November 2023

Radek Mynář (born 22 November 1974) is a Czech professional footballer who plays as a defender for SK Rejšice. After playing in the Czech First League for Marila Příbram and Sparta Prague, he moved to Poland where he played for Dyskobolia Grodzisk and then Polonia Warsaw.

== Honours ==
Sparta Prague

- Czech First League: 2000–01

Dyskobolia Grodzisk Wielkopolski

- Polish Cup: 2006–07
- Ekstraklasa Cup: 2006–07, 2007–08
