= Black Tower (České Budějovice) =

Tower in the Czech Republic

Coordinates: 48°58′32″N 14°28′32″E

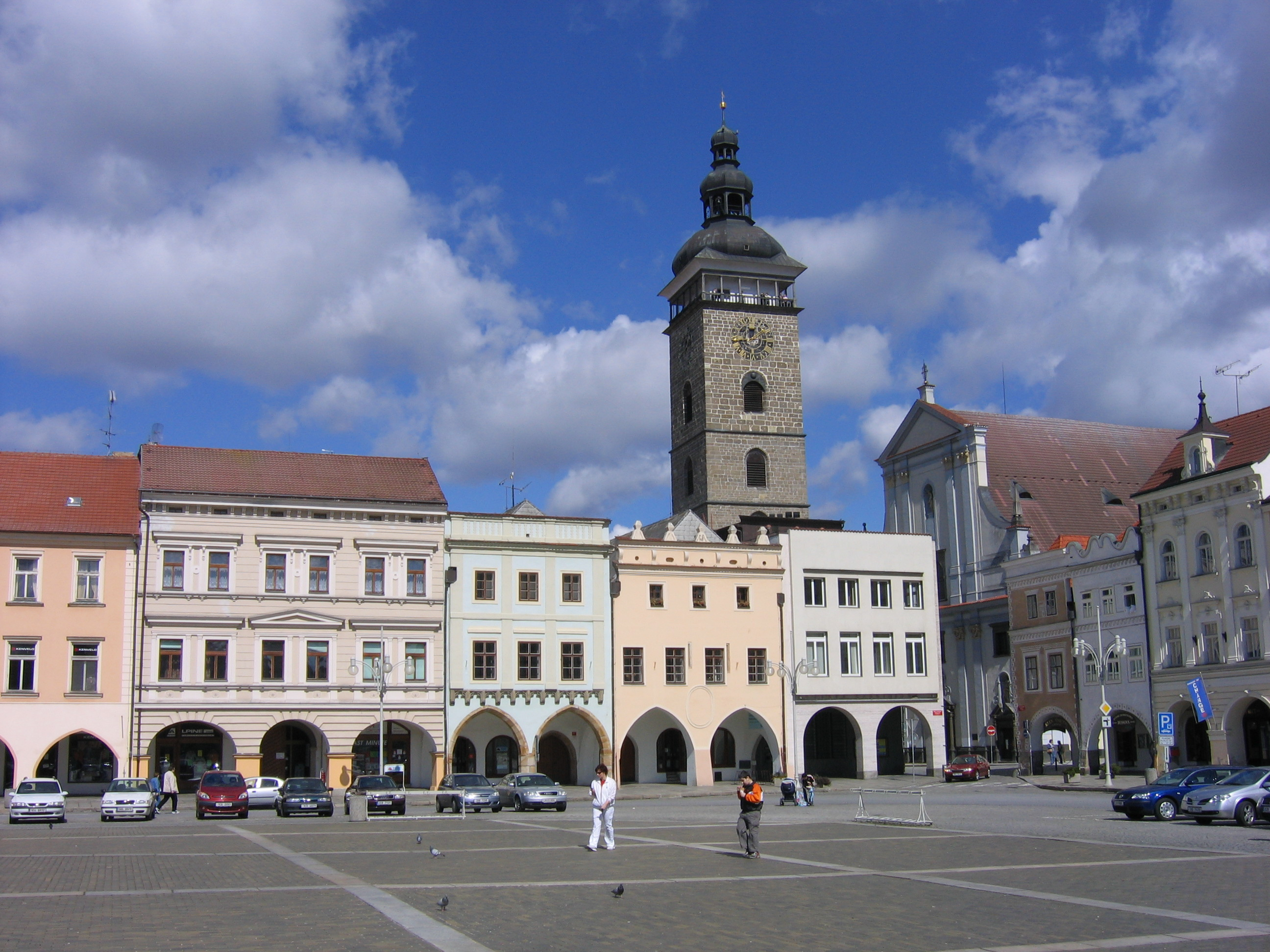
The Black Tower in České Budějovice

Black Tower (Czech: Černá věž) is a well-known 16th century tower in České Budějovice, Czech Republic. It is situated near the north-east corner of Přemysl Otakar II Square, next to the Cathedral of St. Nicholas, and is a favourite sight. The tower has seven bells.
