= Jiří Paďour =

The Most Reverend Jiří Paďour OFMCap
- XII Bishop of České Budějovice
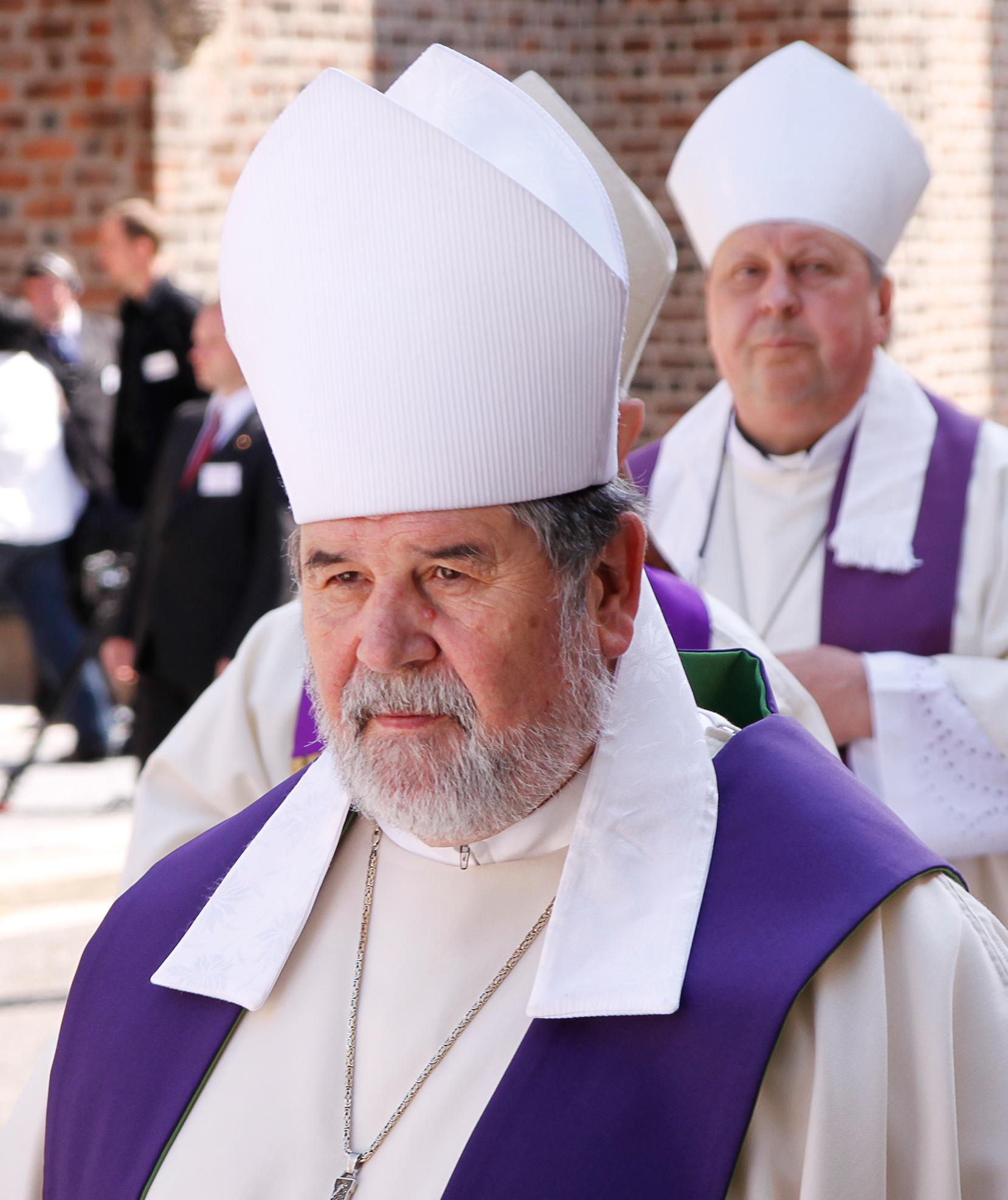
- Jiří Paďour, 2011
- Church: Roman Catholic
- Archdiocese: České Budějovice
- Installed: 2002
- Term ended: 2014
- Predecessor: Antonín Liška
- Successor: Vlastimil Kročil

Personal details
- Born: 4 April 1943 Vraclav, Protectorate of Bohemia and Moravia
- Died: 11 December 2015 (aged 72) Prachatice, Czech Republic
- Motto: Dominus Deus magnus est (Pán Bůh je Veliký)
- Coat of arms

Jiří Paďour OFMCap (4 April 1943 – 11 December 2015) was auxiliary bishop in the Archdiocese of Prague from 1996 to 2001, and the Bishop of České Budějovice from 2002 to 2014.

== Biography ==
Paďour graduated from the Academy of Performing Arts in 1962, where he majored in acting. In the following years he was engaged at the Theatre on the Balustrade. In 1970 he decided to enroll in the seminary at St. Cyril and Methodius Theological Faculty in Litoměřice. He was ordained a priest in 1975, followed by two years (before losing state approval of the Communist regime) where he worked as a priest in Marienbad and its surroundings. On 4 October 1978, he secretly entered into the Capuchin Order.

Paďour was elected as Provincial of the Capuchin Order twice in 1991 and 1994. On 3 December 1996, Pope John Paul II appointed Paďour as titular bishop and auxiliary bishop of Prague. His consecration was on 11 January 1997. On 23 February 2001 he was appointed coadjutor bishop of the Diocese of České Budějovice to Bishop Anthony Liska, and Paďour took over the leadership of the diocese on 25 September 2002.

On 1 March 2014, Pope Francis accepted Paďour's resignation for health reasons. He died on 11 December 2015 in Prachatice.
