= Gottfried Lindauer =

Czech and New Zealand artist

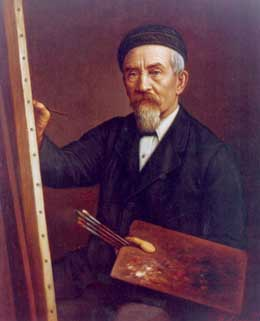
- Self portrait in 1910
- Born: 5 January 1839; Plzeň, Bohemia, Austrian Empire
- Died: 13 June 1926 (aged 87); Woodville, New Zealand
- Relatives: Rebecca Petty (wife); Victor Wilhelm Lindauer (son)

Gottfried Lindauer (5 January 1839 – 13 June 1926) was a Czech and New Zealand painter. He was famous for his portraits, including many of Māori people.

== Czech life and Austrian school ==
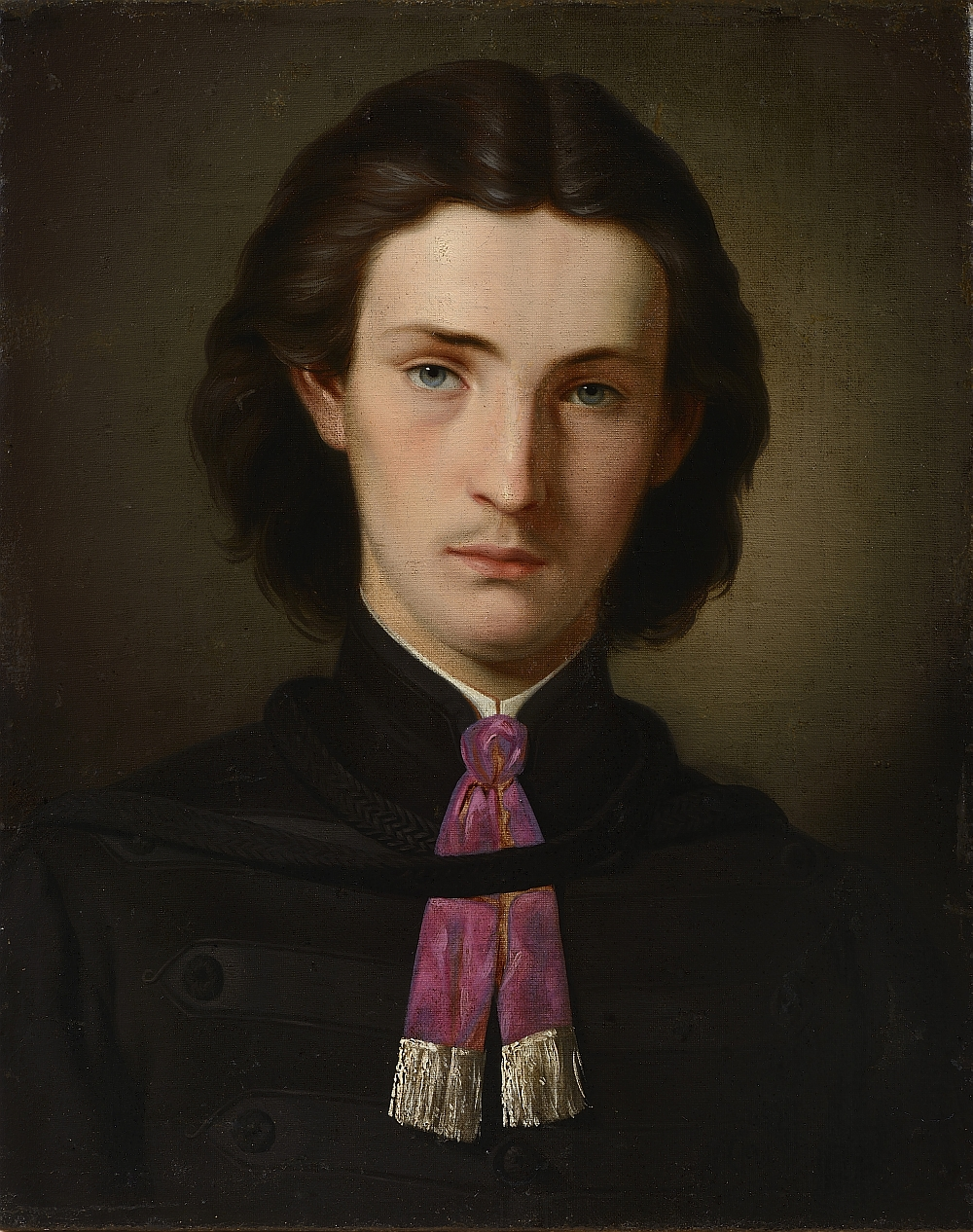
Self-portrait, 1862

He was born Bohumír Lindauer in Plzeň (Pilsen), Bohemia, Austrian Empire (now part of the Czech Republic) on 5 January 1839. His father, Ignatz Lindauer was a gardener. His first drawing experience was plants and trees. From 1855 Lindauer studied at the Academy of Fine Arts in Vienna, where he took classes of Leopold Kupelwieser, Joseph von Führich and Professor Rohl. To increase his chances on the market, he decided to change his name from the Czech Bohumír to the German translation of his name, 'Gottfried'. From his studio in Plzeň he created paintings with religious themes for churches and painting frescoes in the Cathedral churches of Austria. His paintings attracted people, particularly the prominent people who were often the subjects of his paintings, including Bishop Jan Valerián Jirsík. After a sojourn in that city of eighteen months, he went to Moravia for three years.

== New Zealand ==
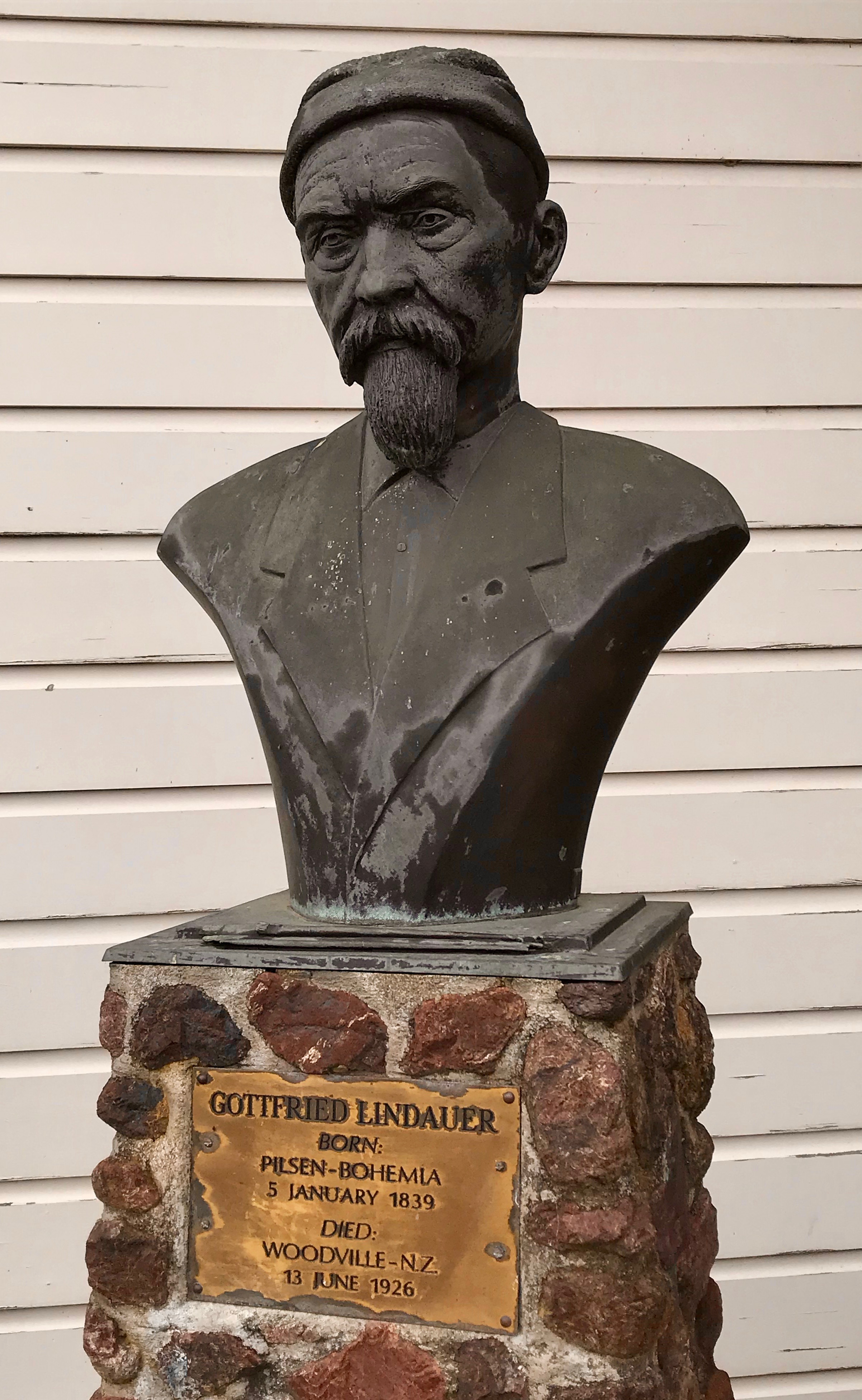
Bust of Lindauer at Woodville, New Zealand, his final home

To avoid being drafted by the Austro-Hungarian army he left for Germany in 1873. From there he sailed for New Zealand on the Reichstag in 1874, arriving in Wellington on 6 August. Many prominent Māori chiefs commissioned his work, which accurately records their facial tattoos, clothing, ornaments and weapons. A series of life-size portraits of Maori chiefs and warriors exhibited by Sir Walter Buller at the Colonial and Indian Exhibition, 1886, were all by Lindauer, who had made the "Maori at home" a subject of special study. Lindauer's Maori paintings are, like many by Ellen von Meyern and Frances Hodgkins, associated with symbolist portraits of demure females with or without a child. One of these, a young poi dancer without a facial tattoo, was so admired by the Prince of Wales that Buller gave it to him. His most famous works are portraits of Heeni Hirini, also known as Ana Rupene, carrying a baby on her back. Lindauer painted this image 30 times.

After visiting his native land in 1886–87, he settled in Woodville, near Wellington, having shortly before married Rebecca, the daughter of Benjamin Prance Petty. They had two sons, Hector and Victor, the latter a phycologist and teacher. Lindauer died in 1926 and is buried in the Old Gorge cemetery in Woodville.

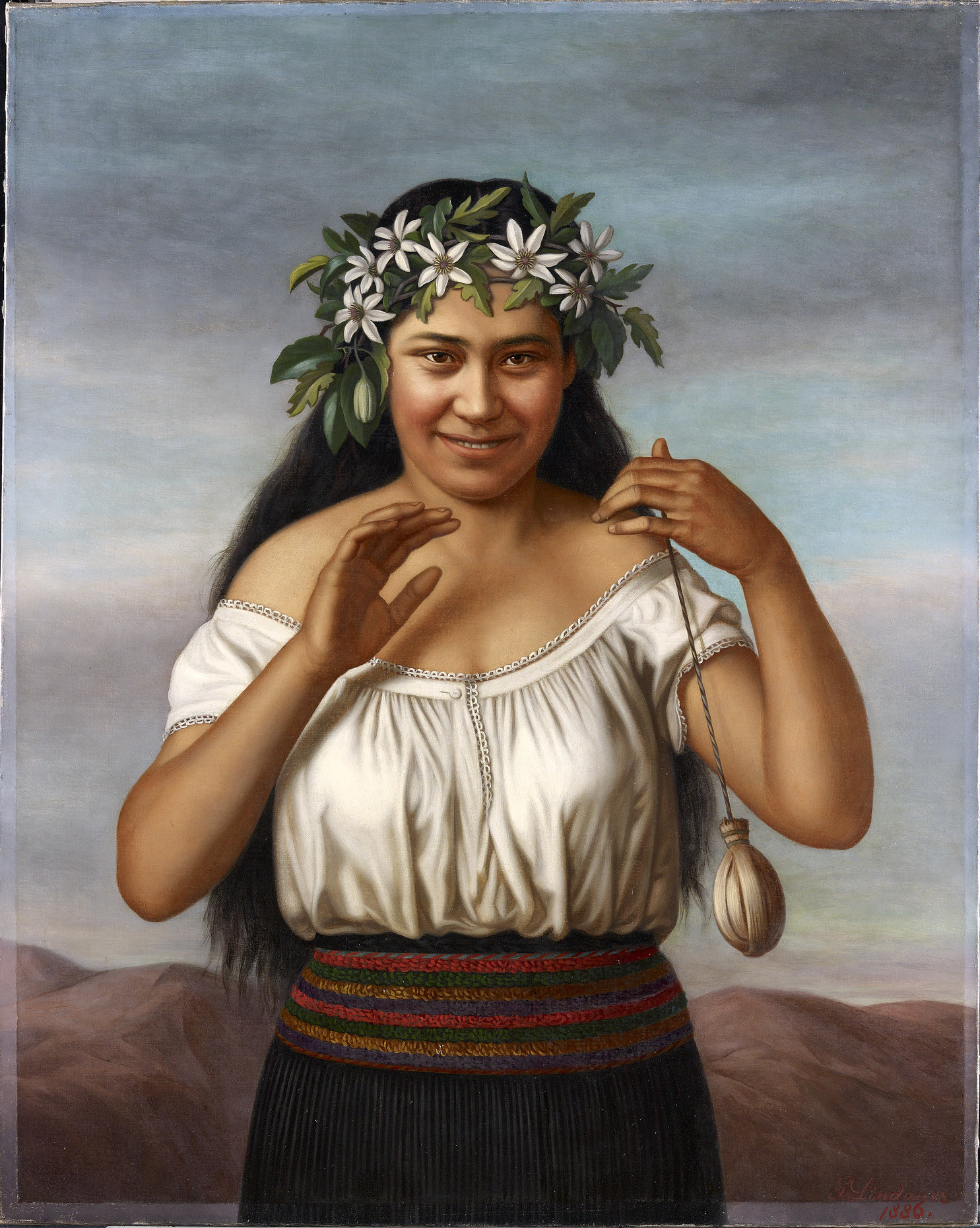
Portrait of Terewai Horomona (b.1866) without facial tattoo

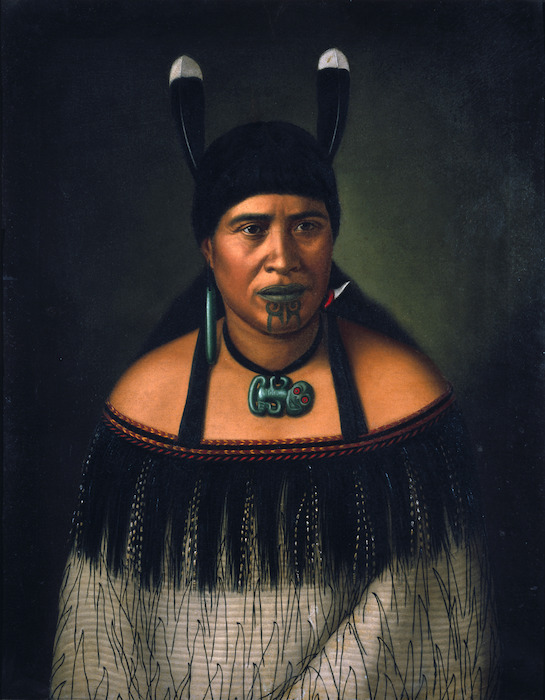
Hinepare, a woman of the Ngāti Kahungunu tribe with facial tattoo

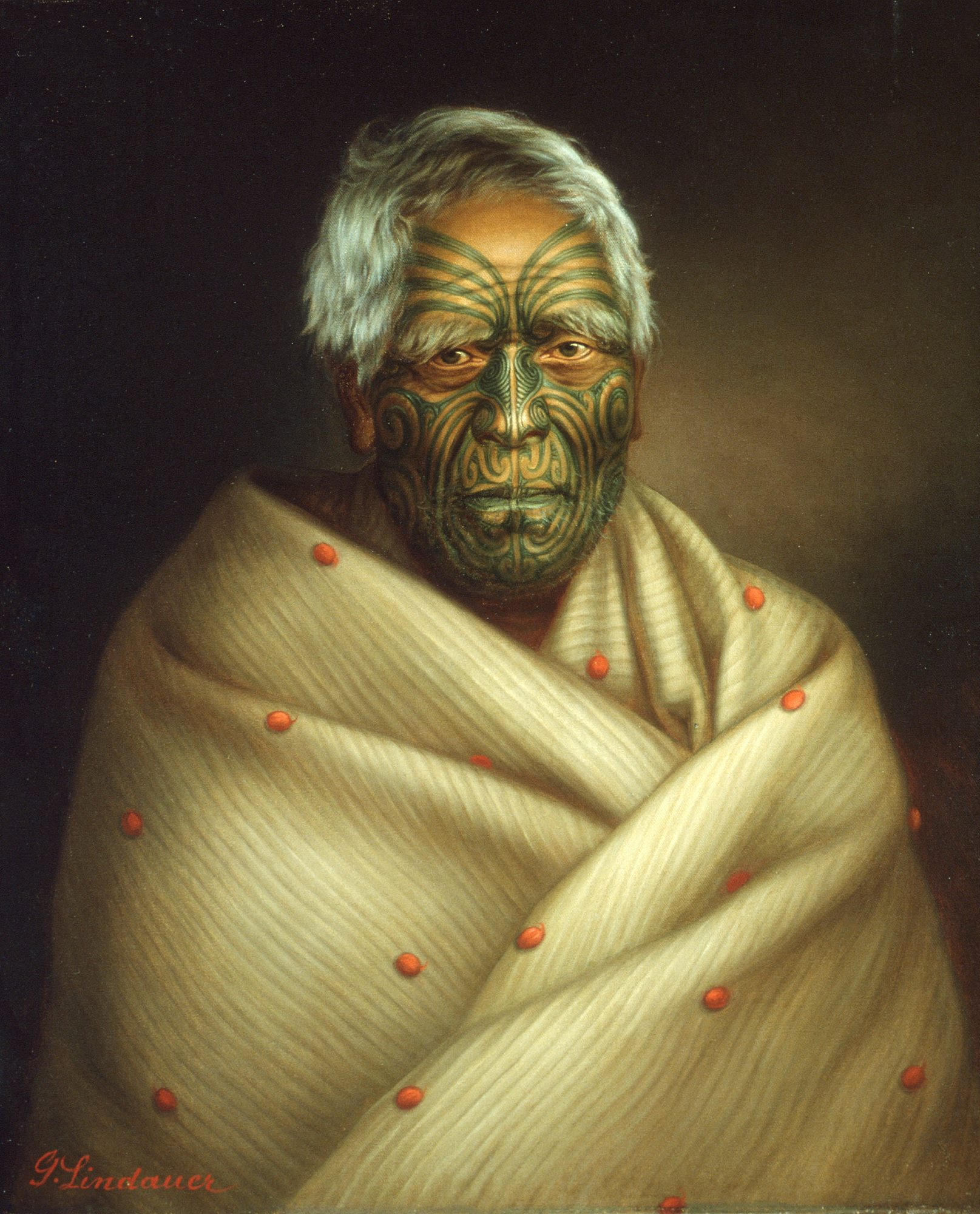
Paratene Te Manu with facial tattoo

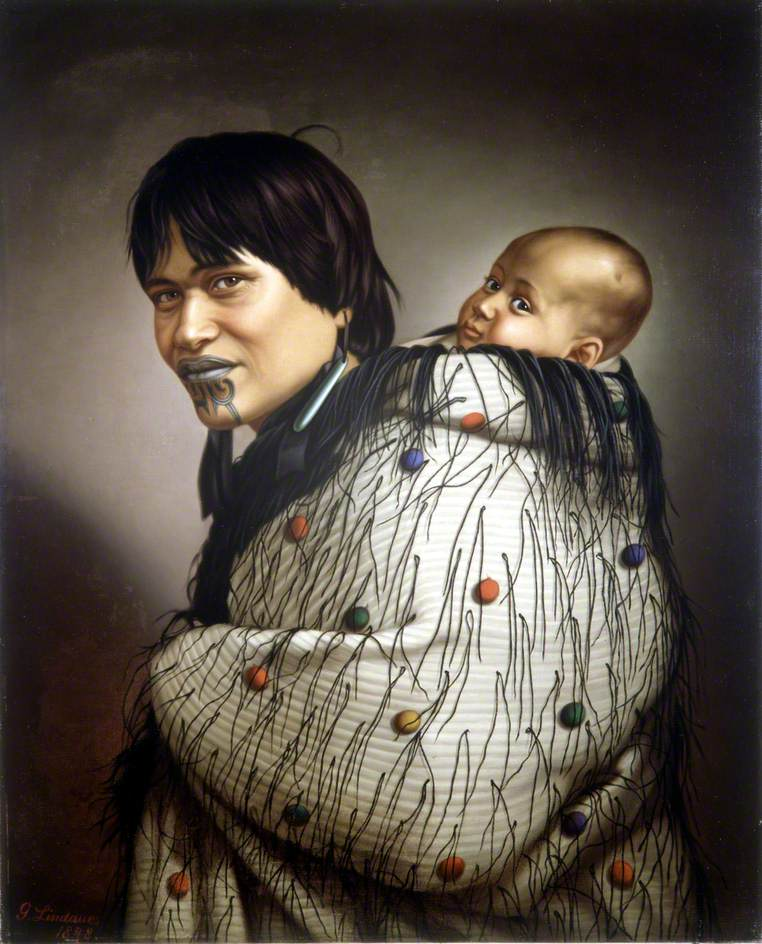
Heeni Hirini
(also known as Ana Rupene) and child

His portrait paintings now fetch high prices; in 2023 a portrait of Māori chief Harawira Te Mihakai sold for $NZ 1,009,008.

== Related information ==
- The New Zealand sparkling wine brand is named Lindauer after the artist.
- Lindauer's portrait of Paratene Te Manu is on the cover of the novel Rangatira by Paula Morris. The novel features a number of fictionalised scenes with Lindauer and Paratene, set during the painting of the portrait in 1886.
- One of Lindauer's sons taught art at Woodville School in the 1920s.
- His relatives were Josef Ondřej Lindauer and Josef Beran.

== See also ==
- C. F. Goldie, another artist known for Māori portraits
