= Čestín =

- Municipality
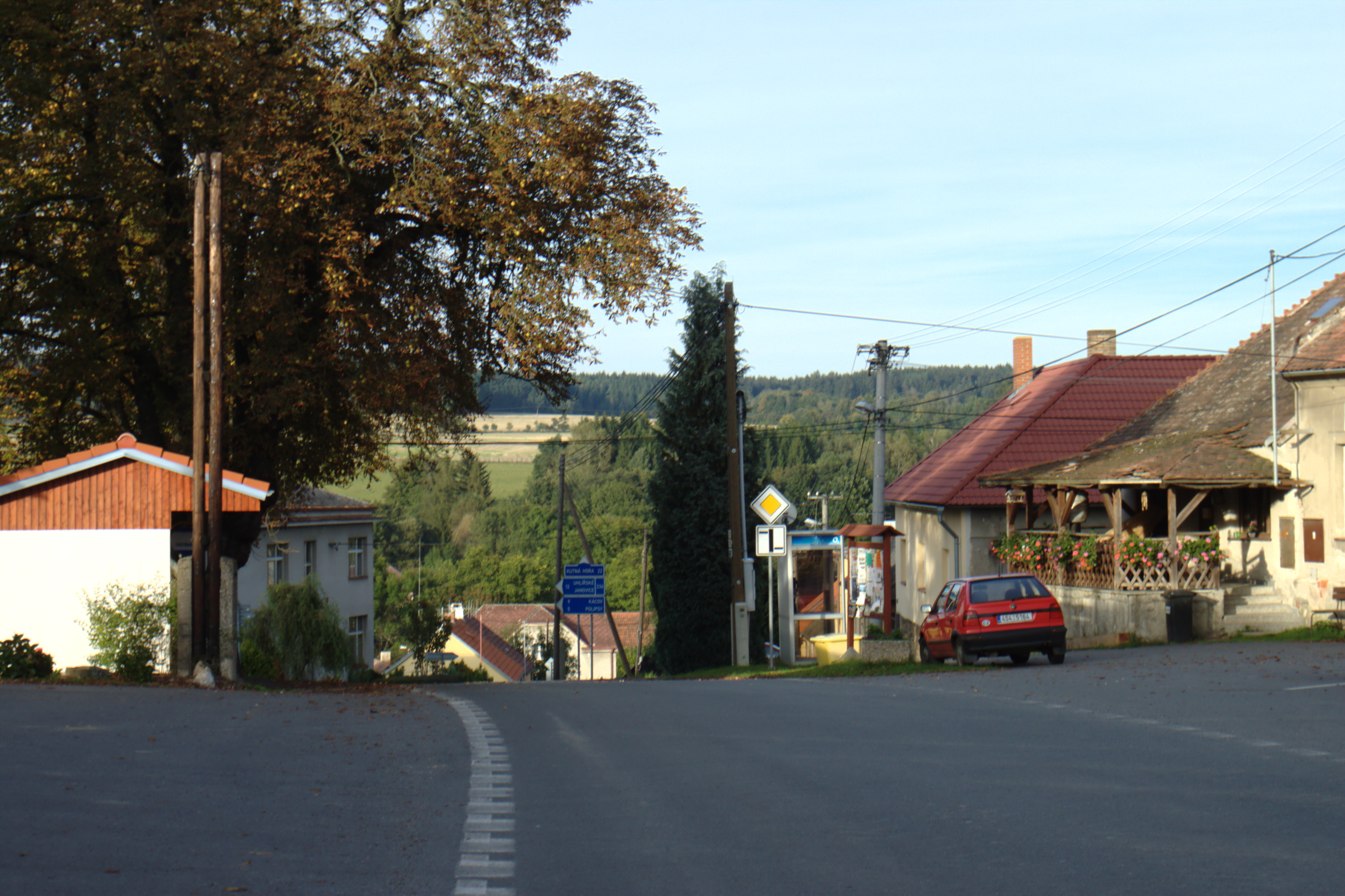
- Centre of Čestín

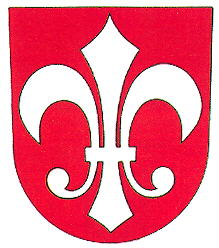
- Coat of arms

- Location in the Czech Republic
- Coordinates: 49°48′28″N 15°6′16″E
- Country: Czech Republic
- Region: Central Bohemian
- District: Kutná Hora
- First mentioned: 1265

Area
  - Total: 32.56 km^{2} (12.57 sq mi)
- Elevation: 475 m (1,558 ft)

Population (2026-01-01)
  - Total: 471
  - Density: 14.5/km^{2} (37.5/sq mi)
- Time zone: UTC+1 (CET)
  - Summer (DST): UTC+2 (CEST)
- Postal codes: 285 10, 285 22
- Website: www.cestin.cz

Čestín is a municipality and village in Kutná Hora District in the Central Bohemian Region of the Czech Republic. It has about 500 inhabitants.

== Administrative division ==
Čestín consists of nine municipal parts (in brackets population according to the 2021 census):

- Čestín (144)
- Čenovice (50)
- Čentice (14)
- Kamenná Lhota (26)
- Kasanice (53)
- Kněž (28)
- Milotice (31)
- Morány (1)
- Polipsy (78)

== Etymology ==
The oldest documented name of Čestín was Čestin Kostel (from the distorted form of the personal name Časta), meaning "Časta's church". In the 18th century, the name was shortened to Čestin and the ending changed to -ín, following the example of similar names.

== Geography ==
Čestín is located about 19 kilometres (12 mi) southwest of Kutná Hora and 49 km (30 mi) southeast of Prague. It lies mostly in the Upper Sázava Hills, only the southwestern part of the municipal territory extends into the Vlašim Uplands. The highest point is the hill Kopaniny at 552 m (1,811 ft) above sea level. The stream Čestínský potok originates here and flows across the municipality. The Sázava River briefly forms the southwestern municipal border.

== History ==
The first written mention of Čestín is from around 1265, when it was named Čestín Kostel. In 1389, a fortress was built here. In 1579, Čestín was promoted to a town by Emperor Rudolf II. It ceased to be a town after World War II.

== Demographics ==
Historical population

Year	Pop.	±%
1869	2,337	—
1880	2,264	−3.1%
1890	2,156	−4.8%
1900	1,914	−11.2%
1910	1,793	−6.3%

Year	Pop.	±%
1921	1,761	−1.8%
1930	1,563	−11.2%
1950	1,177	−24.7%
1961	1,163	−1.2%
1970	946	−18.7%

Year	Pop.	±%
1980	713	−24.6%
1991	592	−17.0%
2001	455	−23.1%
2011	412	−9.5%
2021	425	+3.2%

Source: Censuses

== Transport ==
The railway line Ledeč nad Sázavou–Čerčany runs along the western municipal border. In this section is located the Kácov station, which primarily serves the neighbouring market town of Kácov.

== Sights ==
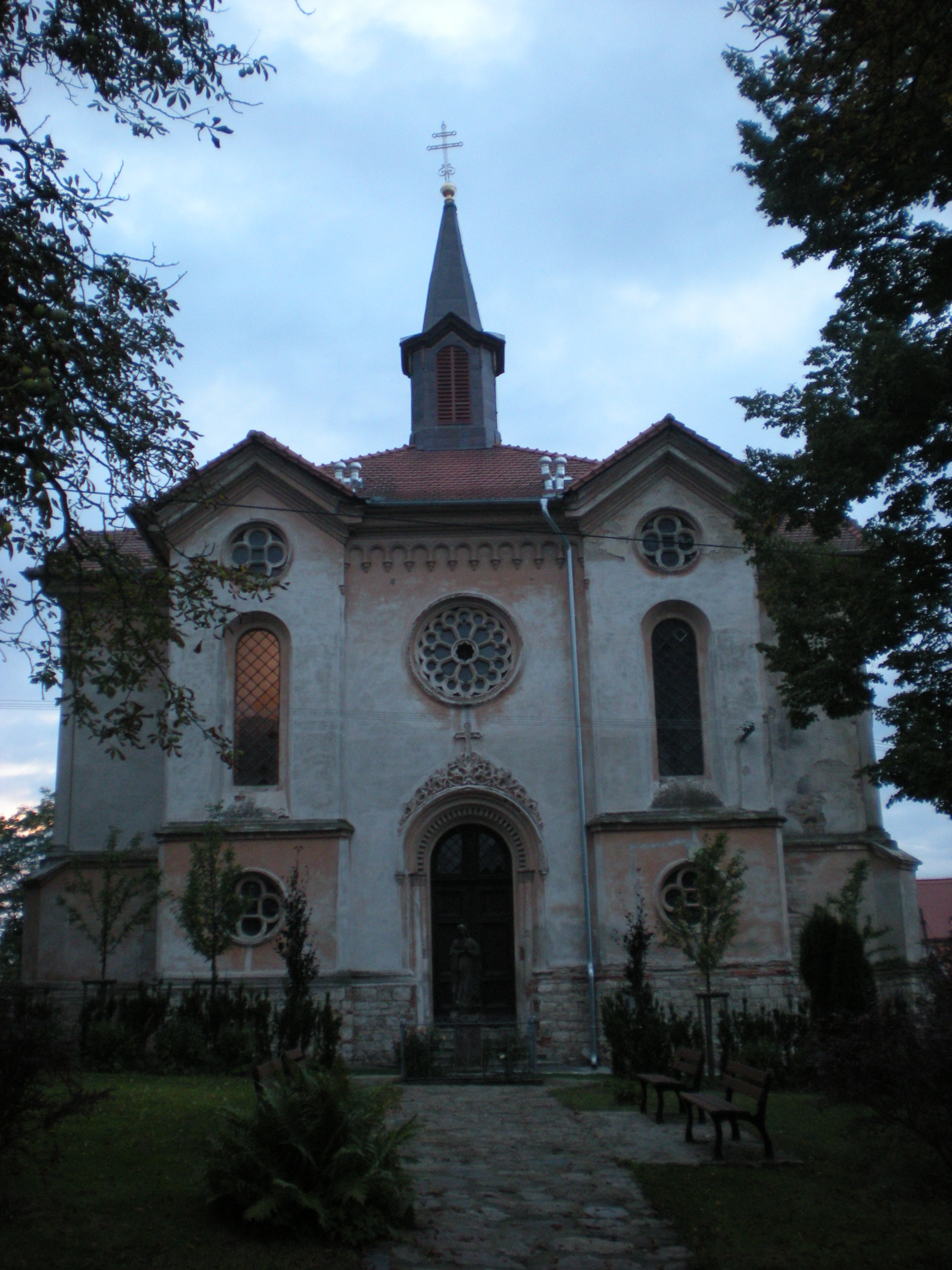
Church of Saints Peter and Paul

Čestlín has two main landmarks, Čestín Castle and Church of Saints Peter and Paul. In 1575–1582, the original fortress was rebuilt to a large Renaissance castle by Adam Slavata of Chlum. The castle was partly demolished in the 19th century.

The Church of Saints Peter and Paul was built in the Neo-Romanesque style in 1859–1861. It replaced an old Romanesque church from the 13th century. The bells in the bell tower date from 1562.

== Notable people ==
- Vilém Slavata of Chlum (1572–1652), nobleman
