= Antonín Eltschkner =

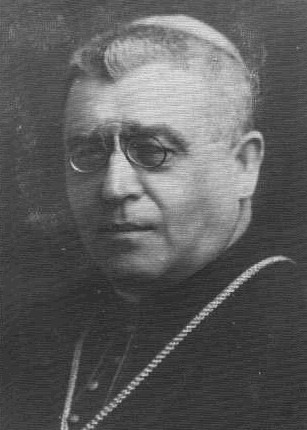
Antonín Eltschkner

Antonín Eltschkner (4 June 1880, Polička – 22 February 1961, Brno) was a Czech Roman Catholic priest, most notable for his involvement in the development of Esperanto. He was provost of the Metropolitan Chapter of St Vitus and auxiliary bishop of Prague from 1933. He was also vicar general of the archdiocese of Prague from January to July 1931.

He was appointed bishop of České Budějovice in 1940, but this was prevented by the German occupation of Czechoslovakia and was abandoned after the end of World War II, when Josef Hlouch was appointed instead.

== Sources ==
- http://www.catholic-hierarchy.org/bishop/belts.html
