= Kácov railway station =

Railway station in Kácov, Czech Republic

Kácov
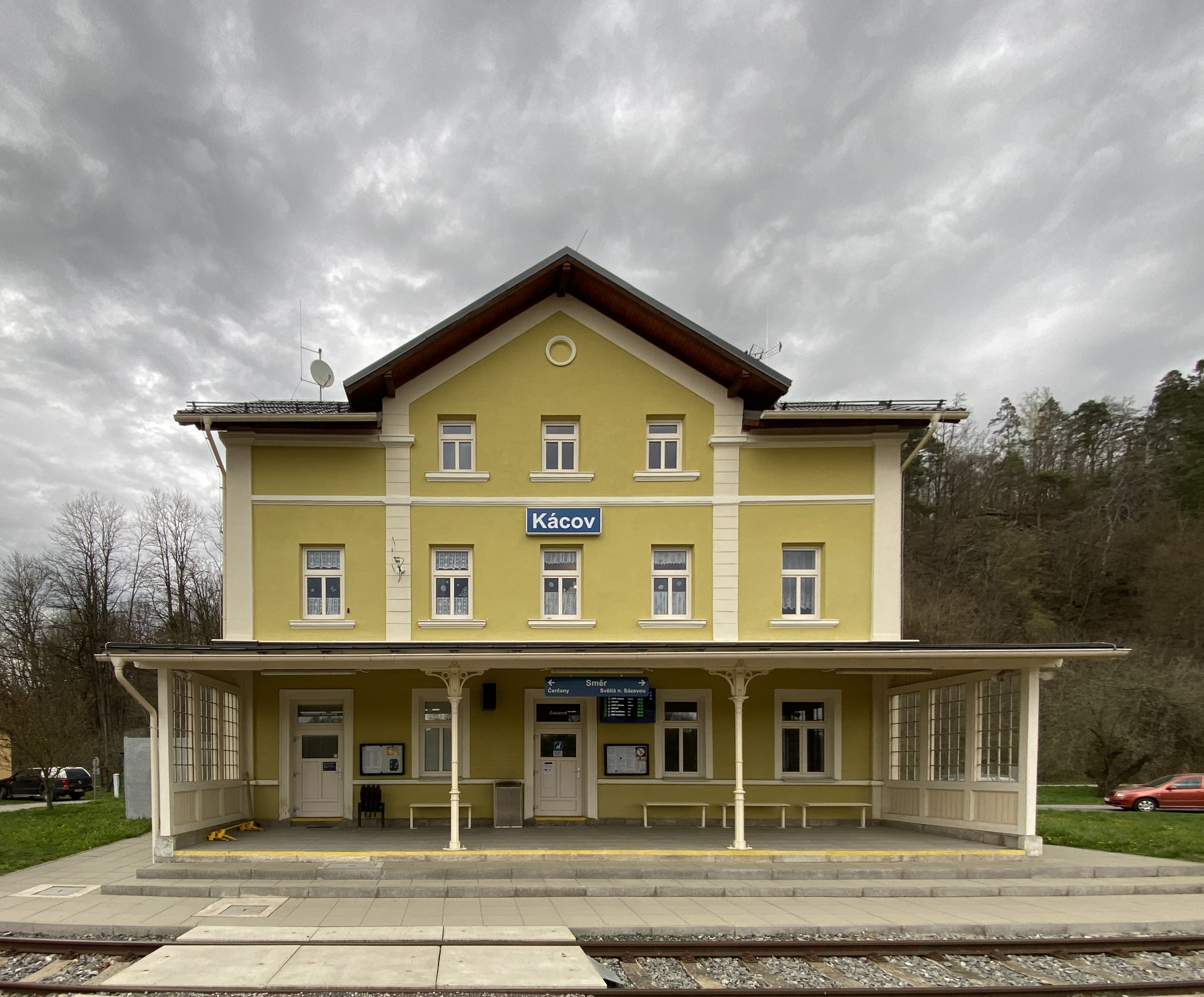

General information
- Location: Kácov, Central Bohemian Region; Czech Republic
- Coordinates: 49°47′12″N 15°01′06″E

Other information
- Fare zone: PID: 7
Location

Kácov railway station (Czech: Železniční stanice Kácov) is a railway station located in Kácov in the Central Bohemian Region of the Czech Republic. It is situated on track 212, part of the Posázavský pacifik, and serves local train services between Zruč nad Sázavou and Ledečko, with some trains continuing to Čerčany.
