= Antonín Liška =

Czech Roman Catholic clergyman

Antonín Liška CSsR
- Bishop of České Budějovice
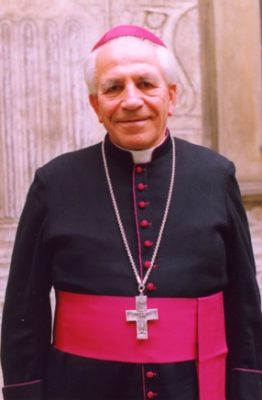
- Church: Catholic Church
- Diocese: Diocese of České Budějovice
- In office: 28 August 1991 – 25 September 2002
- Predecessor: Miloslav Vlk
- Successor: Jiří Paďour
- Previous posts: Titular Bishop of Vergi (1988-1991); Auxiliary Bishop of Prague (1988-1991)

Orders
- Ordination: 22 September 1951 by Kajetán Matoušek
- Consecration: 11 June 1988 by František Tomášek

Personal details
- Born: 17 September 1924 Bohumilice, Bohemia, Czechoslovak Republic
- Died: 15 October 2003 (aged 79) České Budějovice, South Bohemian Region, Czech Republic

Antonín Liška (17 September 1924, Bohumilice – 15 October 2003, České Budějovice) was a Czech Catholic clergyman. From 1991 to 2002 he was the bishop of České Budějovice.

== Sources ==
- http://www.catholic-hierarchy.org/bishop/bliska.html
- http://www.bcb.cz/Dieceze/Dieceze/Diecezni-biskupove?PHPSESSID=51h1es5ka85jdo3nub2r0fn8e1
