= Josef Hlouch =

Czech Roman Catholic prelate and theologian

Servant of God Josef Hlouch
- Bishop of České Budějovice
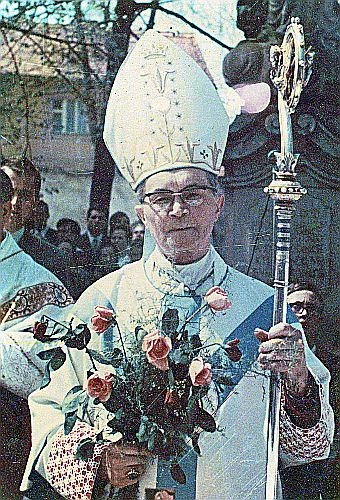
- Hlouch on 22 September 1969.
- Church: Roman Catholic Church
- Diocese: České Budějovice
- See: České Budějovice
- Appointed: 25 June 1947
- Installed: 7 September 1947
- Term ended: 10 June 1972
- Predecessor: Šimon Bárta
- Successor: Miloslav Vlk

Orders
- Ordination: 5 July 1926 by Leopold Prečan
- Consecration: 15 August 1947 by Saverio Ritter

Personal details
- Born: Josef Hlouch; 26 March 1902 Lipník, Austria-Hungary
- Died: 10 June 1972 (aged 70) České Budějovice, Czechoslovakia
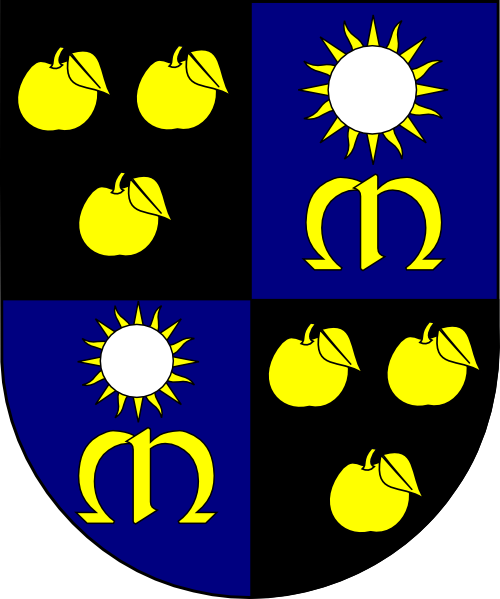
- Coat of arms

Josef Hlouch (26 March 1902 – 10 June 1972) was a Czech Roman Catholic prelate and theologian who served as the Bishop of Budweis from 1947 until his death. Hlouch first served as a parish priest and professor in Olomouc and other places before he was appointed to the episcopate following a standoff between ecclesial authorities and the Nazis as to whom would assume the Budweis episcopal see. He was installed in his new diocese at a time when communist authorities solidified their control over the then-Czechoslovakia which prompted Hlouch and other ecclesial leaders such as Josef Beran to speak out against communist repression. Hlouch was placed under house arrest and later exiled from his diocese but the Prague Spring allowed for him to return in 1968.

The late bishop became known for his holiness and for his leadership of his old diocese and in 2015 the Czech Episcopal Conference lodged a formal request to Rome to open the beatification process. The process opened on 7 November 2017 and he became titled as a Servant of God.

== Life ==
Josef Hlouch was born in Lipník near Třebíč on 26 March 1902 to Jakub Hlouch and Marie Hlouchová.

In 1935 he obtained his doctorate in theological studies in Olomouc after having obtained his habilitation in 1934. He received his ordination to the priesthood in mid-1926 in Olomouc from Archbishop Leopold Prečan. From 1945 until his episcopal appointment he served as a professor to seminarians after having served as a pastor since 1939 just before World War II began. In September 1928 he began serving as the parish administrator for the Hodolana parish in Olomouc.

Hlouch was later appointed as a bishop and received his episcopal consecration from Saverio Ritter in Olomouc with Josef Beran and Stanislav Zela serving as the co-consecrators.

His solemn enthronement in his episcopal see came as a relief to the faithful since the see had been vacant since 1940. The Nazis had opposed a particular prelate nominated for the position leading to Pope Pius XII leaving the see vacant; the Nazis defeat in 1945 allowed for Hlouch to be appointed as a bishop. His constant criticisms and opposition to the communist regime in the then-Czechoslovakia prompted his exile from the diocese. This was exacerbated when the authorities began monitoring all his activities after a 19 June 1949 sermon where he criticized the nation's direction under the regime. He returned to his diocese on 9 June 1968 on the occasion of the Prague Spring. Hlouch had even been placed under house arrest in 1950 and in 1952 was arrested and then exiled from his diocese without a court trial. He left for several cities during this time first in Liberec and then in Mladá Vožice.

In 1963 the facilitated negotiations between Pope John XXIII and the Czech Socialist Republic allowed for imprisoned bishops to be released. This prompted Hlouch's release in April 1963.

In 1968 he sent a letter to Miloslav Vlk in which he asked the then-deacon to become his personal aide. This was much to Vlk's surprise who had hoped to go abroad for further studies. Prior to Vlk's ordination he met with Hlouch in the bishopric for breakfast one morning where he spoke to the prelate about his plans for his future studies. Hlouch met with Vlk again one morning in the bishopric for breakfast two weeks later in which the latter assented to the role. Hlouch later ordained Vlk as a priest on 23 June 1968.

Hlouch died on 10 June 1972. His reputation for holiness had been noted in his life as well as for his gentle smile combined with his thoughtful nature. The communists did not allow for Pope Paul VI to name a successor which rendered the see vacant until Pope John Paul II appointed Miloslav Vlk as Hlouch's successor.

== Beatification process ==
From 2012 the late bishop's friend and aide Miloslav Vlk - now a cardinal - said that a beatification process could be launched because the potential for a formal application to Rome was something being evaluated. The Czech Episcopal Conference in autumn 2015 made a formal application to the Congregation for the Causes of Saints to launch the cause with the C.C.S. issuing the "nihil obstat" decree on 7 November 2017 in a move that titled Hlouch as a Servant of God.

The diocesan process to collect documentation and witness testimonies is expected to be launched sometime in 2018.
