= List of bishops of České Budějovice =

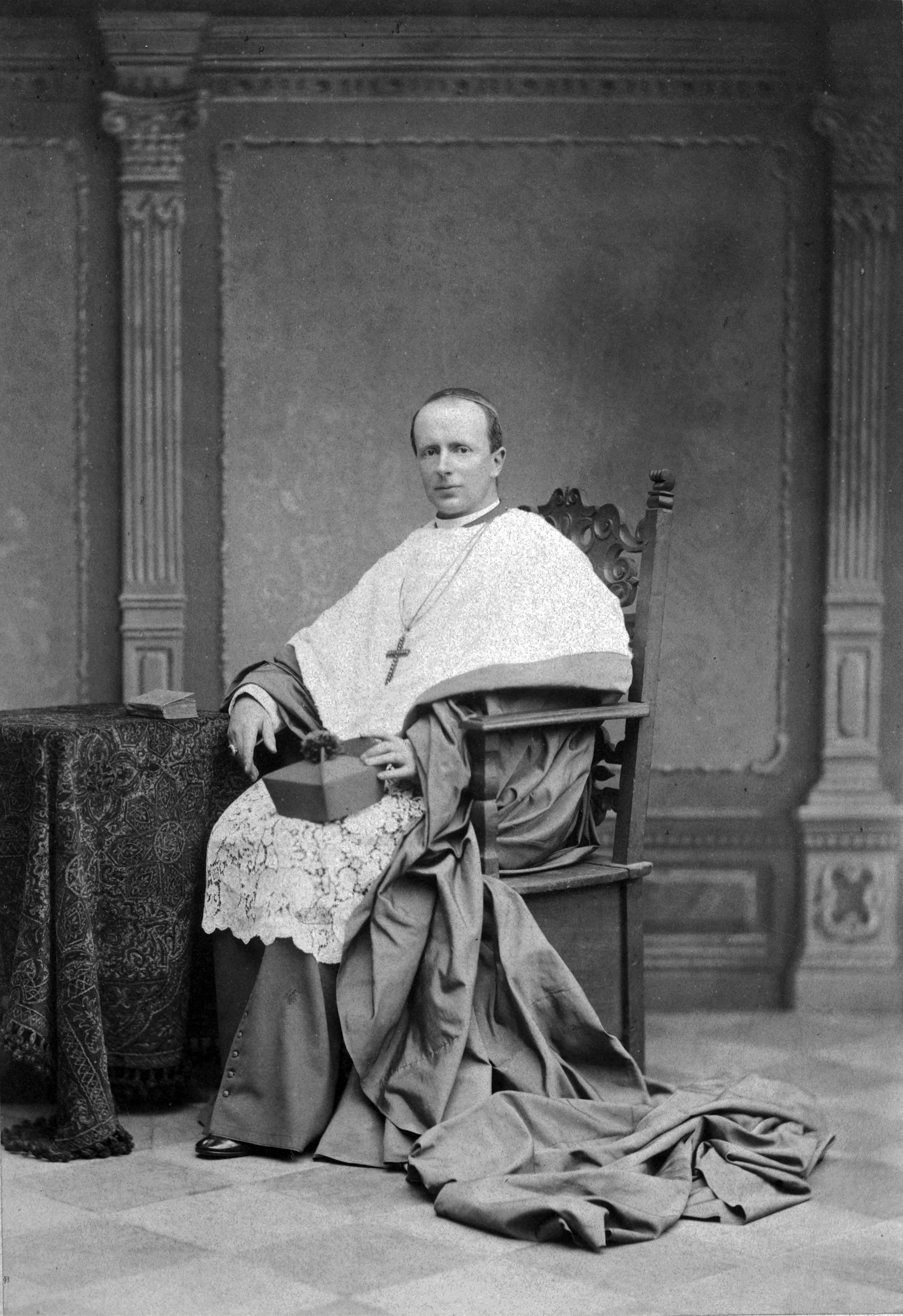
František Schönborn

Bishop of České Budějovice is the diocesan bishop of the Diocese of České Budějovice, which covers the south of Bohemia and small tail of southwest Moravia.

- Jan Prokop Schaaffgotsche (1785–1813)
- Arnošt Konstantin Růžička (1815–1845)
- Josef Ondřej Lindauer (1845–1850)
- Jan Valerián Jirsík (1851–1883)
- : Karel Průcha (he was appointed 1883, but did not undertake dioceses for illness, died closely after appointing)
- František Schönborn (1883–1885; 1985–1899 Archbishop of Prague)
- Martin Josef Říha (1885–1907)
- Josef Antonín Hůlka (1907–1920)
- Šimon Bárta (1920–1940)
- : Antonín Eltschkner (appointed 1940, for resistance of Germany occupational power could not undertake diocese)
- Josef Hlouch (1947–1972, did not manage diocese on 1950–1968 for repression from communistic authority, 1952–1963 was interned outside diocese)
- Miloslav Vlk (1990–1991; from 1991 Archbishop of Prague)
- Antonín Liška (1991–2002)
- Jiří Paďour (2002–2014)
- Vlastimil Kročil (2015–present)
