= Arnošt Konstantin Růžička =

- Bishop of České Budĕjovice
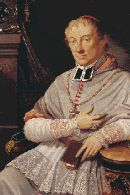
- Arnošt Konstantin Růžička
- Church: Catholic Church
- Diocese: Diocese of České Budĕjovice
- In office: 8 March 1816 – 18 March 1845
- Predecessor: Jan Prokop Schaaffgotsche
- Successor: Josef Ondřej Lindauer

Orders
- Ordination: 15 June 1785
- Consecration: 25 August 1816 by Václav Leopold Chlumčanský

Personal details
- Born: 21 December 1761 Tloskov, Kingdom of Bohemia, Holy Roman Empire
- Died: 18 March 1845 (aged 83) České Budějovice, Kingdom of Bohemia, Austrian Empire

Arnošt Konstantin Růžička (German: Ernest Konstantin Růžička; 21 December 1761, Tloskov – 18 March 1845, České Budějovice) was the second bishop of České Budějovice, appointed after the seat had been vacant since 1813.

== Life ==
He was ordained priest in Prague on 15 July 1785, before serving as vice rector and then rector of the General Seminary in Galician Lviv. He was appointed a canon in České Budějovice on 20 July 1794 and was made vicar general to bishop Johann Prokop Schaffgotsch on 12 October 1797. After Schaffgotsch died in 1813, the see fell vacant and Růžička acted as its administrator.

On 15 June 1815 Francis II of Austria nominated him as bishop of Budweis, with papal confirmation from Pope Pius VII following on 25 August 1816. He was consecrated bishop in St Ursula's Church in Prague by Archbishop Wenzel Leopold Chlumčanský of Přestavlk and enthroned on 22 September 1816 in České Budějovice. He remained bishop for almost thirty years and was one of four Bohemian bishops to whom Pope Gregory XVI wrote in 1845 affirming the liturgical use of the term "Immaculate Conception" in relation to the Virgin Mary.

He was buried in the church cemetery of St. Prokop in Budweis.

== Sources ==
- http://www.catholic-hierarchy.org/bishop/bruzi.html ^{[self-published]}
