= Jan Valerián Jirsík =

Roman Catholic clergyman (1798–1883)

- Bishop of České Budĕjovice
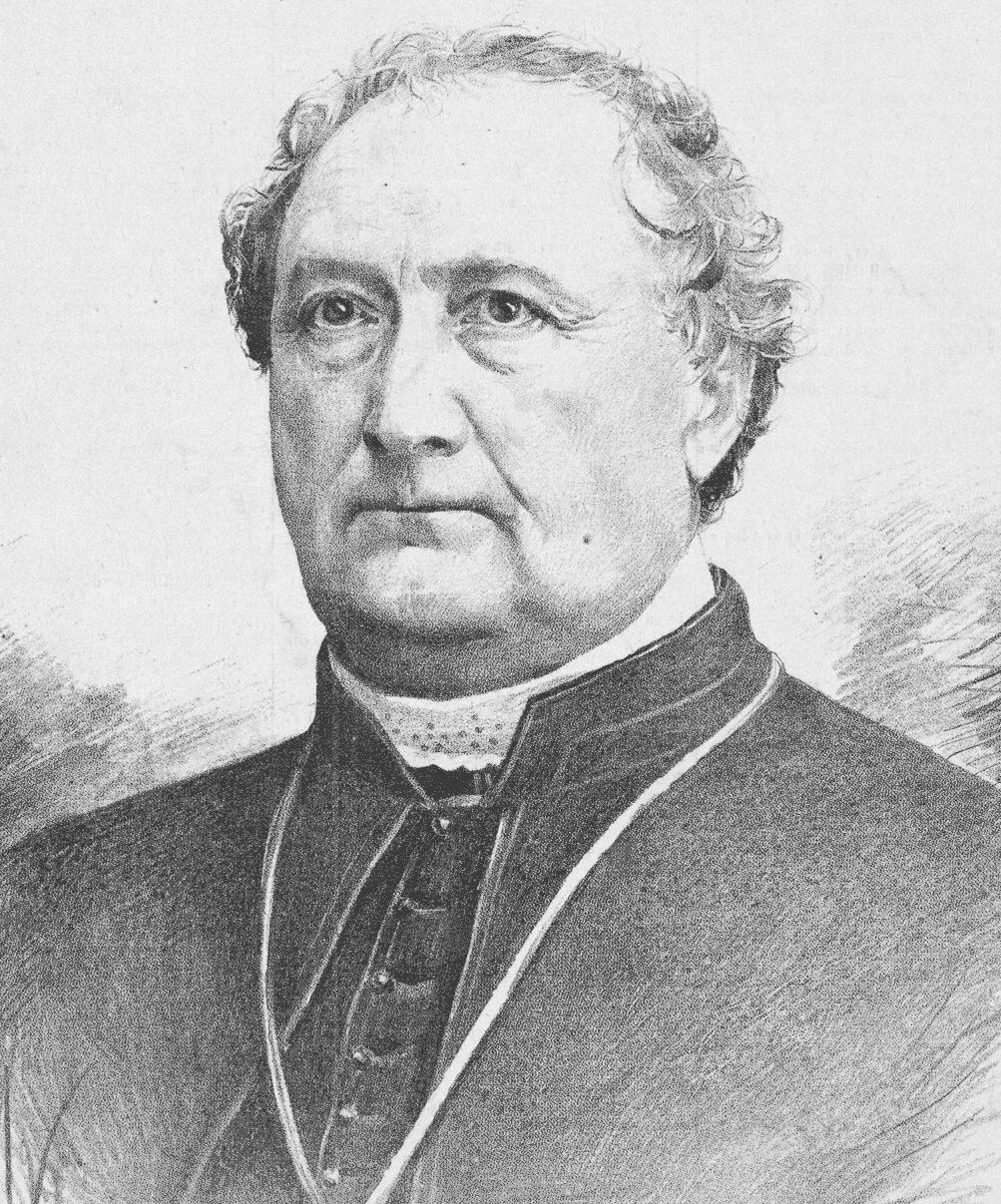
- Jan Jirsik; portrait by Jan Vilímek
- Church: Catholic Church
- Diocese: Diocese of České Budějovice
- In office: 5 September 1581 – 23 February 1883
- Predecessor: Josef Ondřej Lindauer
- Successor: Franziskus von Paula Graf von Schönborn

Orders
- Ordination: 28 December 1820
- Consecration: 19 October 1851 by Friedrich of Schwarzenberg

Personal details
- Born: Jan Viktorin Jirsík; 19 June 1798 Kácov, Kingdom of Bohemia, Holy Roman Empire
- Died: 23 February 1883 (aged 84) České Budějovice, Kingdom of Bohemia, Cisleithania, Austria-Hungary

Jan Valerián Jirsík (19 June 1798, Kácov – 23 February 1883, České Budějovice) was a Roman Catholic clergyman, who was appointed the fourth Bishop of České Budějovice in 1851.

== See also ==
- 133077 Jirsík, asteroid
