= Josef Ondřej Lindauer =

Roman Catholic clergyman and bishop

- Bishop of České Budĕjovice
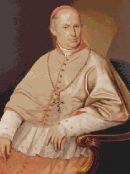
- Josef Ondřej Lindauer
- Church: Catholic Church
- Diocese: Diocese of České Budějovice
- In office: 24 November 1845 – 5 June 1850
- Predecessor: Arnošt Konstantin Růžička
- Successor: Jan Valerián Jirsík

Orders
- Ordination: 16 August 1807
- Consecration: 18 January 1846 by Alois Josef, Freiherr von Schrenk

Personal details
- Born: 29 November 1784 Plzeň, Kingdom of Bohemia, Holy Roman Empire
- Died: 5 June 1850 (aged 65) České Budějovice, Kingdom of Bohemia, Austrian Empire

Josef Ondřej Lindauer (29 November 1784, Plzeň – 5 June 1850, České Budějovice) was a Roman Catholic clergyman and bishop, who from 1845 to 1850 served as the third bishop of České Budějovice.

== Life ==
He was ordained priest on 15 August 1807 in Prague and was nominated bishop by Ferdinand I of Austria on 22 September 1845, with confirmation from Pope Gregory XVI on 25 November, consecration on 18 January the following year in the Veitsdom in Prague, and enthronement on 2 February.

== Sources ==
- http://www.catholic-hierarchy.org/bishop/blinda.html ^{[self-published]}
- http://www.bcb.cz/Dieceze/Dieceze/Biskupove
