= Cathedral of St Nicholas, České Budějovice =

Cathedral of St Nicholas
- Katedrála svatého Mikuláše
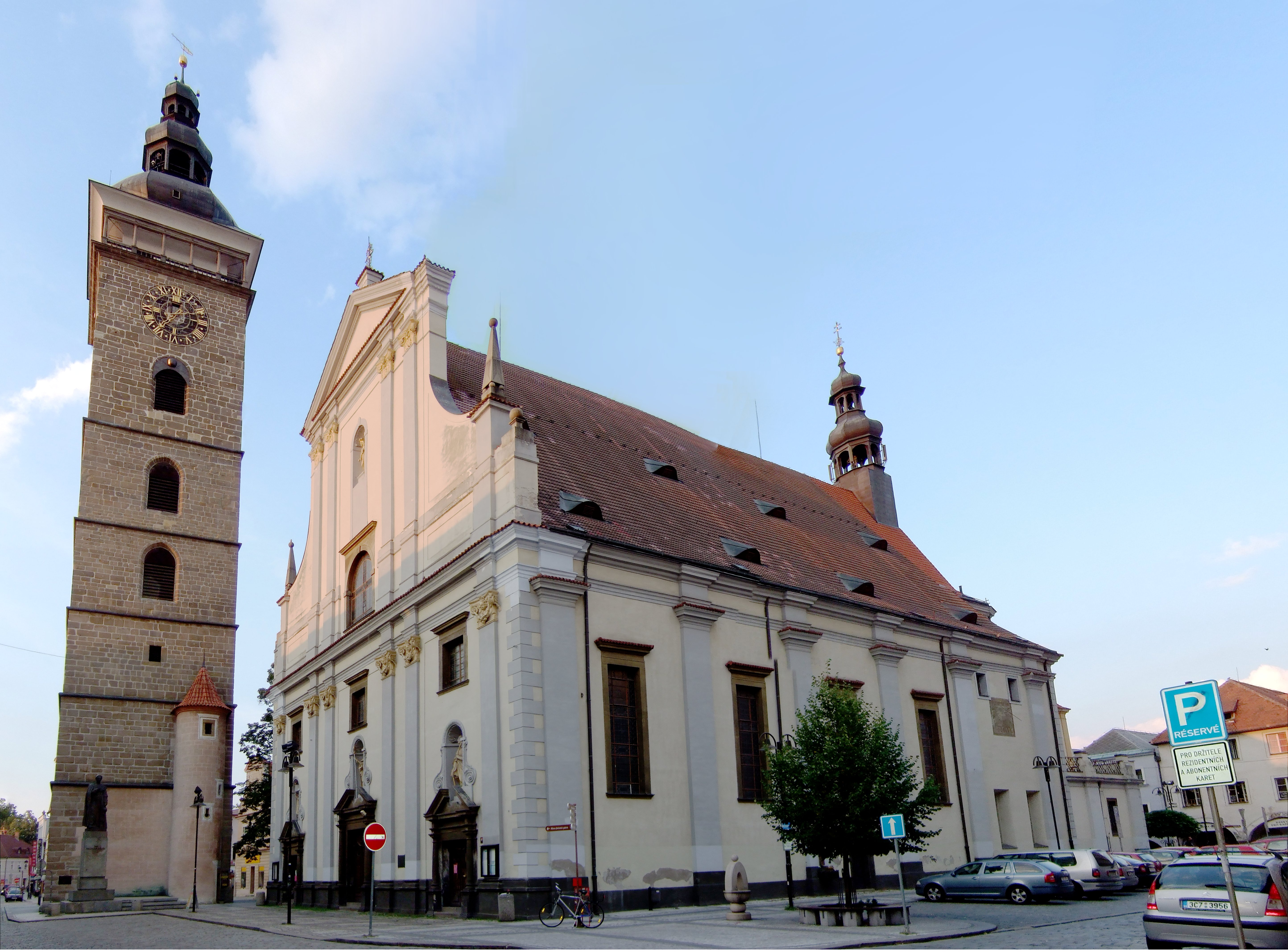

- Location within Czech Republic
- 48°58′30.9″N 14°28′33.5″E
- Location: České Budějovice
- Country: Czech Republic
- Denomination: Roman Catholic
- Website: Website of the Cathedral

History
- Status: Active
- Founded: 1265
- Dedication: Saint Nicholas
- Consecrated: 22 December 1912

Architecture
- Functional status: Cathedral and Parish church
- Style: Baroque

Administration
- Diocese: České Budějovice

Clergy
- Bishop: Vlastimil Kročil

The Cathedral of St Nicholas (Czech: Katedrála svatého Mikuláše) is a Roman Catholic cathedral located in the city of České Budějovice in the Czech Republic.

== History ==
The foundation stone of the parish church České Budějovice was laid around 1265, shortly after the founding of the city. The church of St Nicholas was consecrated in 1297, although it was still incomplete at the time. The completion of the main building probably occurred sometime around the mid 14th century. The original Gothic church was damaged by fire and repaired in the years 1513 - 1518. The church was significantly rebuilt several times. During the 16th century the church acquired a new bell tower called the Black Tower. In the 17th century, reconstruction took place and the church acquired its current baroque appearance. The church has a triple nave layout with 18th century interiors. In 1785 the interior was renovated when the church was elevated to a cathedral due to the creation of the Diocese of České Budějovice.

A cemetery was located beside the church and was in use from the Middle Ages up to the year 1784, when the decree of Emperor Joseph II forbade further burials. Between 1969 and 1971 internal adjustments were made in the cathedral in order to improve the liturgical space after the changes made during the Second Vatican Council.
