= Bohumilice =

- Municipality
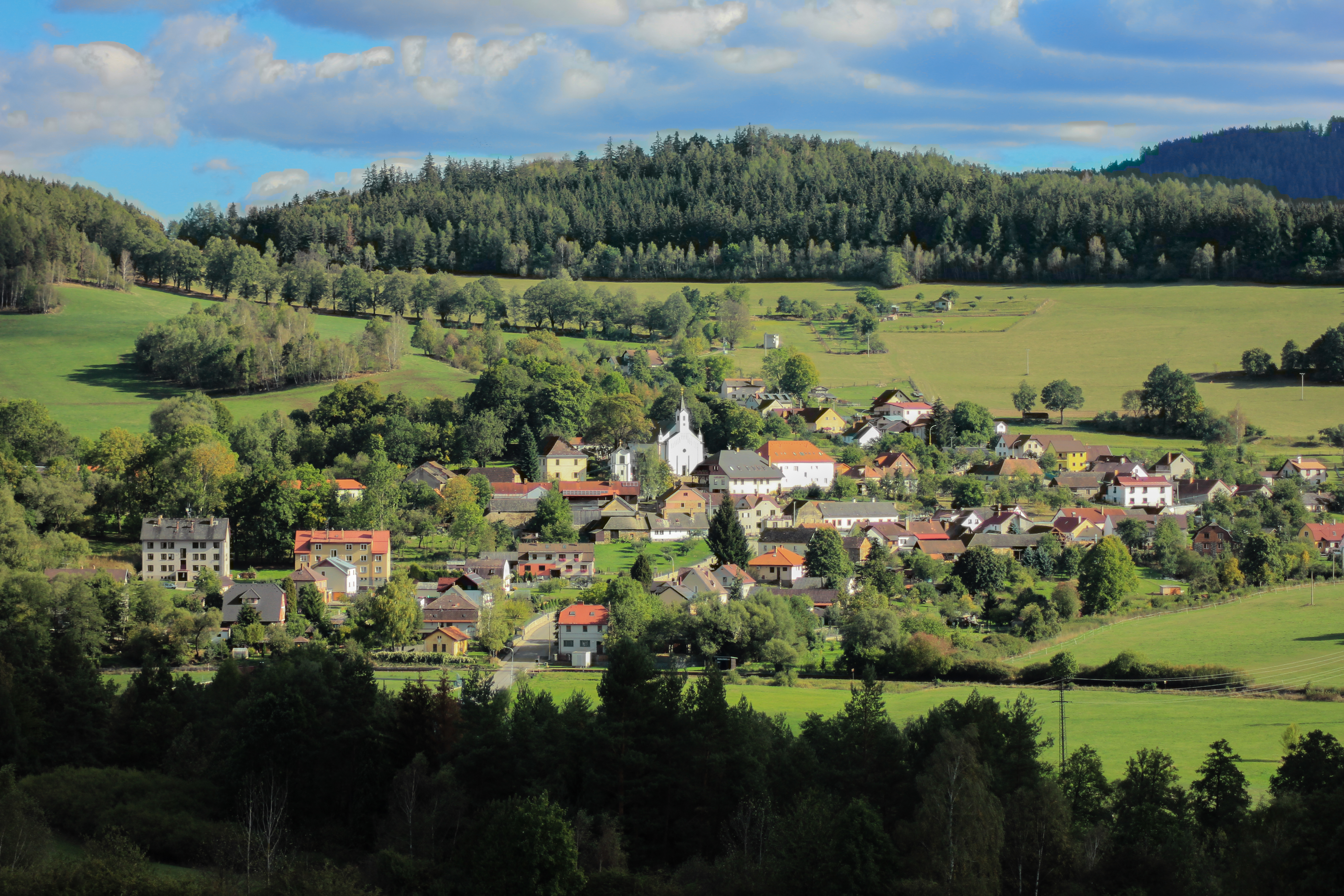
- View from the north

- Location in the Czech Republic
- Coordinates: 49°5′46″N 13°48′59″E
- Country: Czech Republic
- Region: South Bohemian
- District: Prachatice
- First mentioned: 1352

Area
  - Total: 3.42 km^{2} (1.32 sq mi)
- Elevation: 575 m (1,886 ft)

Population (2026-01-01)
  - Total: 317
  - Density: 92.7/km^{2} (240/sq mi)
- Time zone: UTC+1 (CET)
  - Summer (DST): UTC+2 (CEST)
- Postal code: 384 81
- Website: www.bohumilice.cz

Bohumilice is a municipality and village in Prachatice District in the South Bohemian Region of the Czech Republic. It has about 300 inhabitants.

Bohumilice lies approximately 17 kilometres (11 mi) north-west of Prachatice, 50 km (31 mi) west of České Budějovice, and 119 km (74 mi) south of Prague.

== Demographics ==
Historical population
Year	Pop.	±%
1869	423	—
1880	406	−4.0%
1890	423	+4.2%
1900	434	+2.6%
1910	428	−1.4%
1921	442	+3.3%
1930	480	+8.6%
1950	380	−20.8%
1961	394	+3.7%
1970	389	−1.3%
1980	347	−10.8%
1991	313	−9.8%
2001	322	+2.9%
2011	321	−0.3%
2021	306	−4.7%
Source: Censuses

== Notable people ==
- Antonín Liška (1924–2003), bishop of České Budějovice
