= Žimutice =

- Municipality
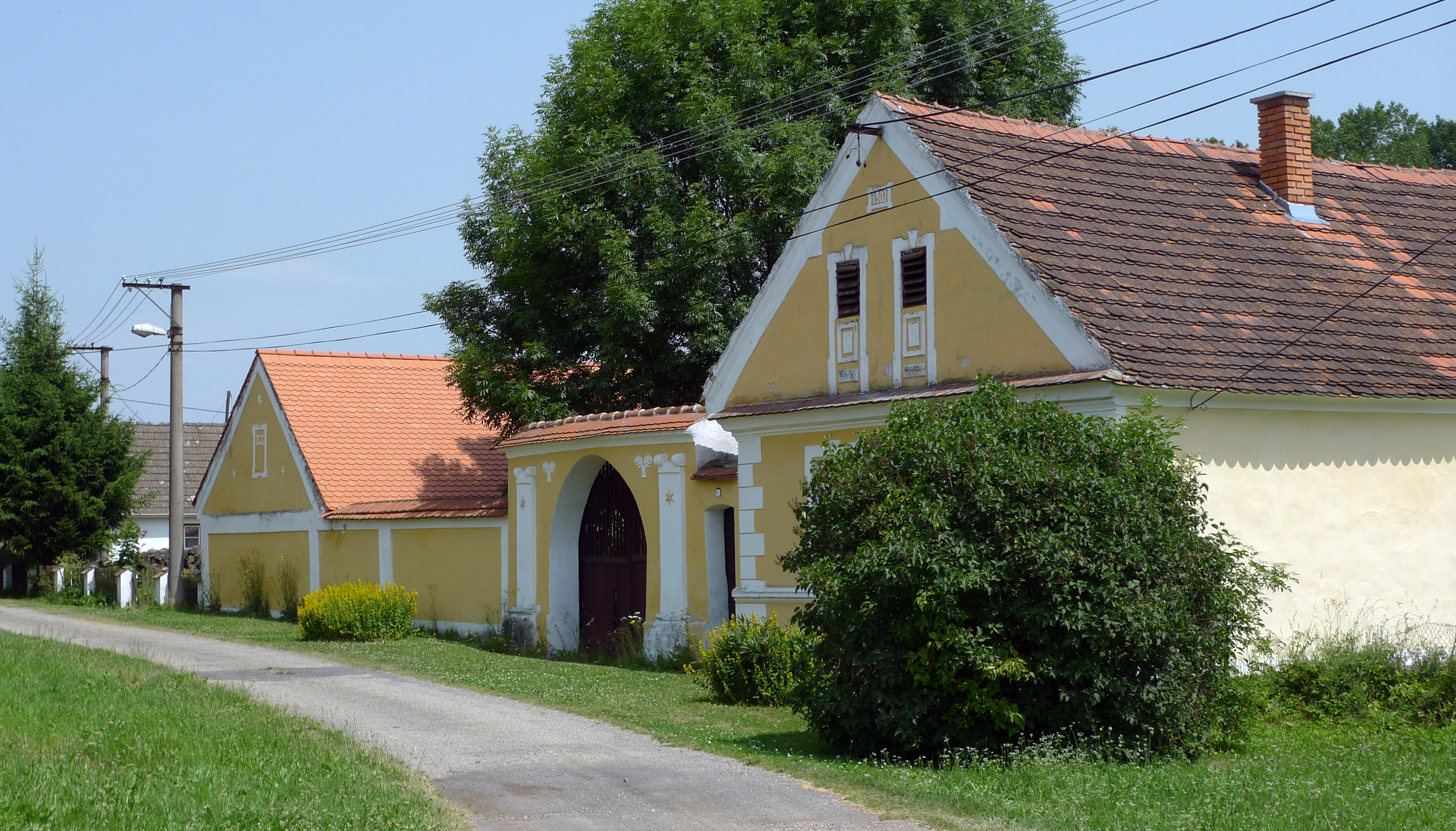
- Pořežany, a part of Žimutice

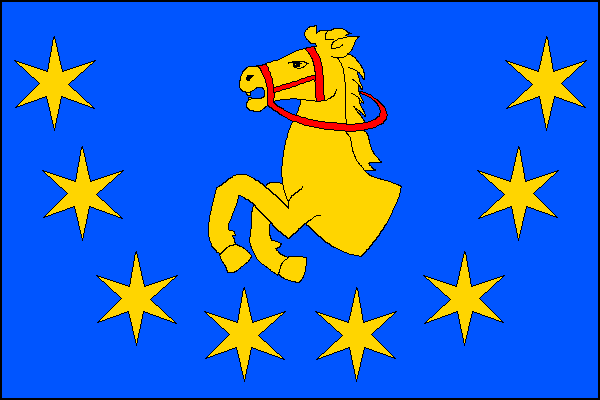
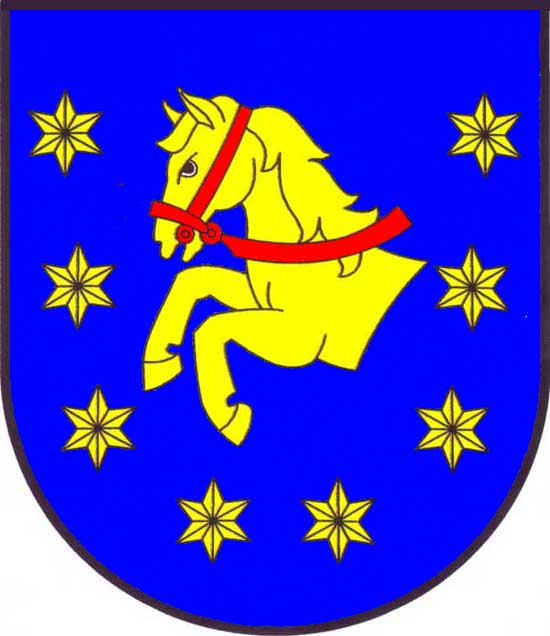
- Flag Coat of arms

- Location in the Czech Republic
- Coordinates: 49°12′14″N 14°30′38″E
- Country: Czech Republic
- Region: South Bohemian
- District: České Budějovice
- First mentioned: 1261

Area
  - Total: 31.73 km^{2} (12.25 sq mi)
- Elevation: 443 m (1,453 ft)

Population (2026-01-01)
  - Total: 622
  - Density: 19.6/km^{2} (50.8/sq mi)
- Time zone: UTC+1 (CET)
  - Summer (DST): UTC+2 (CEST)
- Postal codes: 373 65, 373 66, 375 01
- Website: www.zimutice.cz

Žimutice is a municipality and village in České Budějovice District in the South Bohemian Region of the Czech Republic. It has about 600 inhabitants.

Žimutice lies approximately 26 kilometres (16 mi) north of České Budějovice and 99 km (62 mi) south of Prague.

== Administrative division ==
Žimutice consists of eight municipal parts (in brackets population according to the 2021 census):

- Žimutice (216)
- Hrušov (15)
- Krakovčice (31)
- Pořežany (120)
- Smilovice (105)
- Sobětice (40)
- Třitim (26)
- Tuchonice (41)

Smilovice and the group of Pořežany, Třitim and Tuchonice form two exclaves of the municipal territory.

== Demographics ==
Historical population
Year	Pop.	±%
1869	1,638	—
1880	1,534	−6.3%
1890	1,428	−6.9%
1900	1,365	−4.4%
1910	1,447	+6.0%
1921	1,372	−5.2%
1930	1,348	−1.7%
1950	984	−27.0%
1961	981	−0.3%
1970	769	−21.6%
1980	687	−10.7%
1991	671	−2.3%
2001	584	−13.0%
2011	558	−4.5%
2021	594	+6.5%
Source: Censuses

== Notable people ==
- Šimon Bárta (1864–1940), Bishop of České Budějovice
