= Neveklov =

- Town
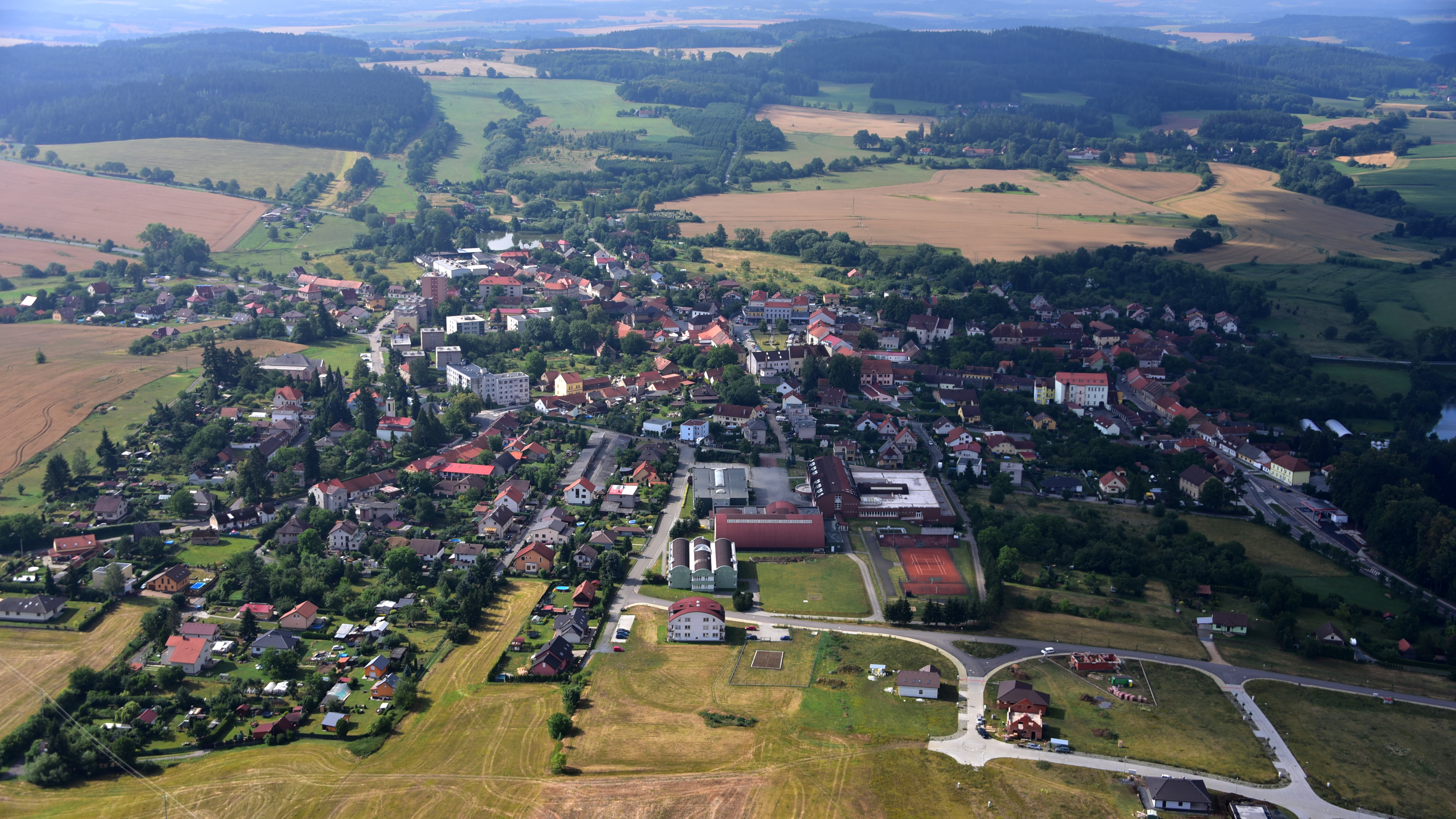
- Aerial view

- Flag Coat of arms

- Location in the Czech Republic
- Coordinates: 49°45′11″N 14°32′9″E
- Country: Czech Republic
- Region: Central Bohemian
- District: Benešov
- First mentioned: 1285

Government
  - Mayor: Ladislav Trumpich

Area
  - Total: 54.46 km^{2} (21.03 sq mi)
- Elevation: 413 m (1,355 ft)

Population (2026-01-01)
  - Total: 2,779
  - Density: 51.03/km^{2} (132.2/sq mi)
- Time zone: UTC+1 (CET)
  - Summer (DST): UTC+2 (CEST)
- Postal codes: 257 44, 257 56
- Website: www.neveklov.cz

Neveklov (Czech pronunciation: [ˈnɛvɛklof]) is a town in Benešov District in the Central Bohemian Region of the Czech Republic. It has about 2,800 inhabitants.

== Administrative division ==
Neveklov consists of 23 municipal parts (in brackets population according to the 2021 census):

- Neveklov (1,413)
- Bělice (116)
- Blažim (50)
- Borovka (46)
- Chvojínek (29)
- Dalešice (68)
- Doloplazy (1)
- Dubovka (10)
- Heroutice (6)
- Hůrka Kapinos (37)
- Jablonná (152)
- Kožlí (0)
- Lipka (24)
- Mlékovice (112)
- Nebřich (77)
- Neštětice (53)
- Ouštice (45)
- Přibyšice (61)
- Radslavice (28)
- Spolí (18)
- Tloskov (233)
- Zádolí (114)
- Zárybnice (10)

== Etymology ==
The initial name of Neveklov was probably Nevyklov or Neviklov. This would mean that the name was derived from the personal name Nevykl or Nevikl, meaning "Nevykl's/ Nevikl's (court)".

== Geography ==
Neveklov is located about 11 kilometres (7 mi) west of Benešov and 29 km (18 mi) south of Prague. It lies in a hilly landscape of the Benešov Uplands. The highest point is the hill Neštětická hora at 534 m (1,752 ft) above sea level. The municipal territory is rich in fishponds, the largest of which is Panský rybník. The eastern border of the vast territory is formed by Slapy Reservoir.

== History ==
The first written mention of Neveklov is from 1285, when the Rosenberg family sold the village to the Zderaz Monastery. The village was promoted to a town by King Ferdinand I in 1563. The town was badly damaged by the fires in 1752, 1772 and 1814.

== Demographics ==
Historical population

Year	Pop.	±%
1869	4,006	—
1880	4,180	+4.3%
1890	4,175	−0.1%
1900	3,987	−4.5%
1910	3,746	−6.0%

Year	Pop.	±%
1921	3,579	−4.5%
1930	3,355	−6.3%
1950	2,426	−27.7%
1961	2,499	+3.0%
1970	2,383	−4.6%

Year	Pop.	±%
1980	2,383	+0.0%
1991	2,289	−3.9%
2001	2,359	+3.1%
2011	2,541	+7.7%
2021	2,703	+6.4%

Source: Censuses

== Transport ==
There are no railways or major roads passing through the municipality.

== Sights ==
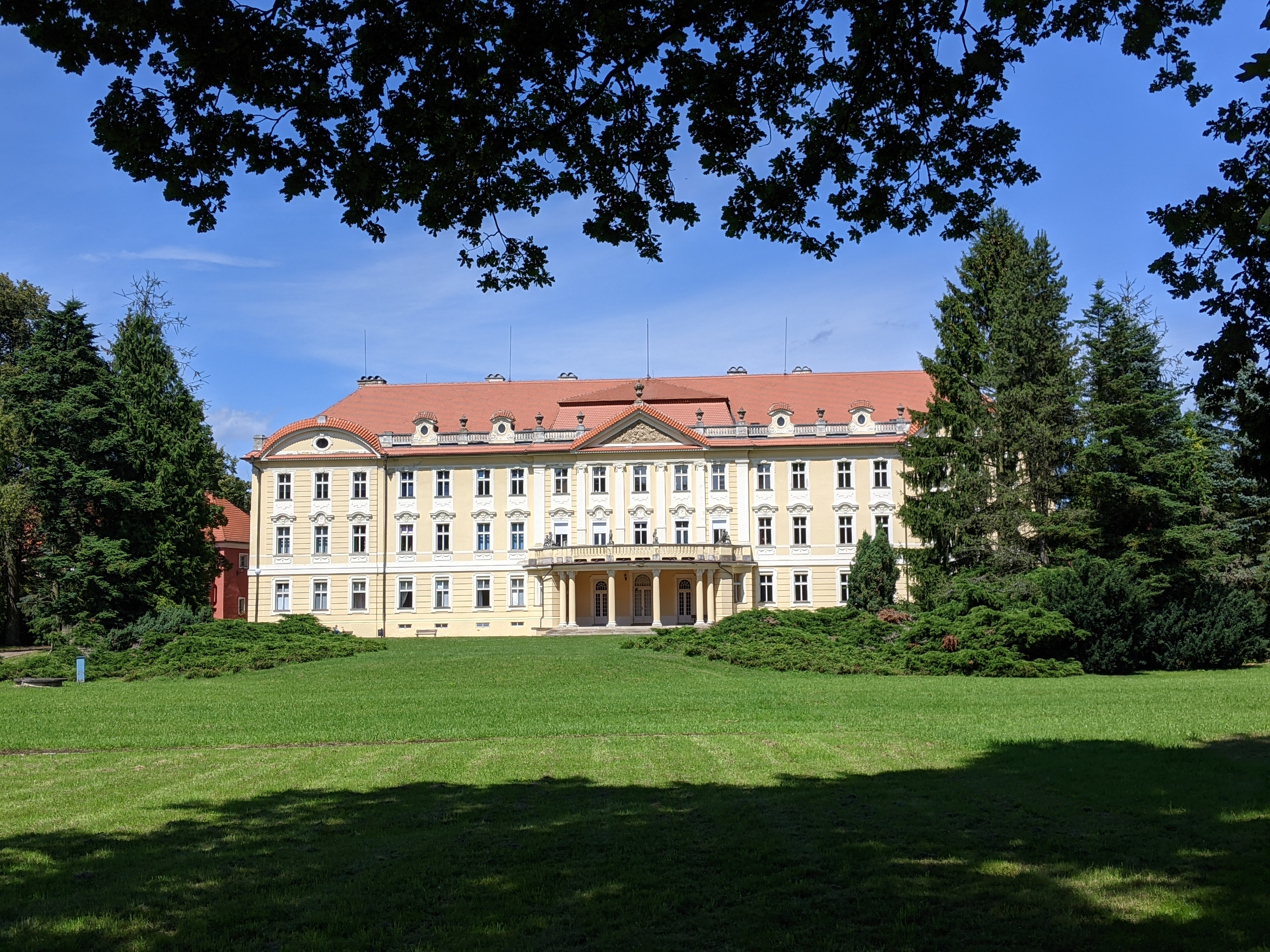
Tloskov Castle

The Church of Saint Gall is an early Gothic church with Renaissance and Baroque modifications.

The fortress in Tloskov was first documented in 1376. During the rule of the Hodějovský family between 1574 and 1620, it was rebuilt into a castle. In the mid-18th century, Tloskov Castle was rebuilt in the Baroque style and extended, and the castle park was established. In the first half of the 19th century, the castle was completely rebuilt in the late Neoclassical style. Today is houses an institute of social care.

On Neštětická hora hill is the eponymous observation tower. It has an asymmetrical shape and was built in 1927.

== Notable people ==
- Arnošt Konstantin Růžička (1761–1845), Bishop of České Budějovice
