= Lipník (Třebíč District) =

- Municipality
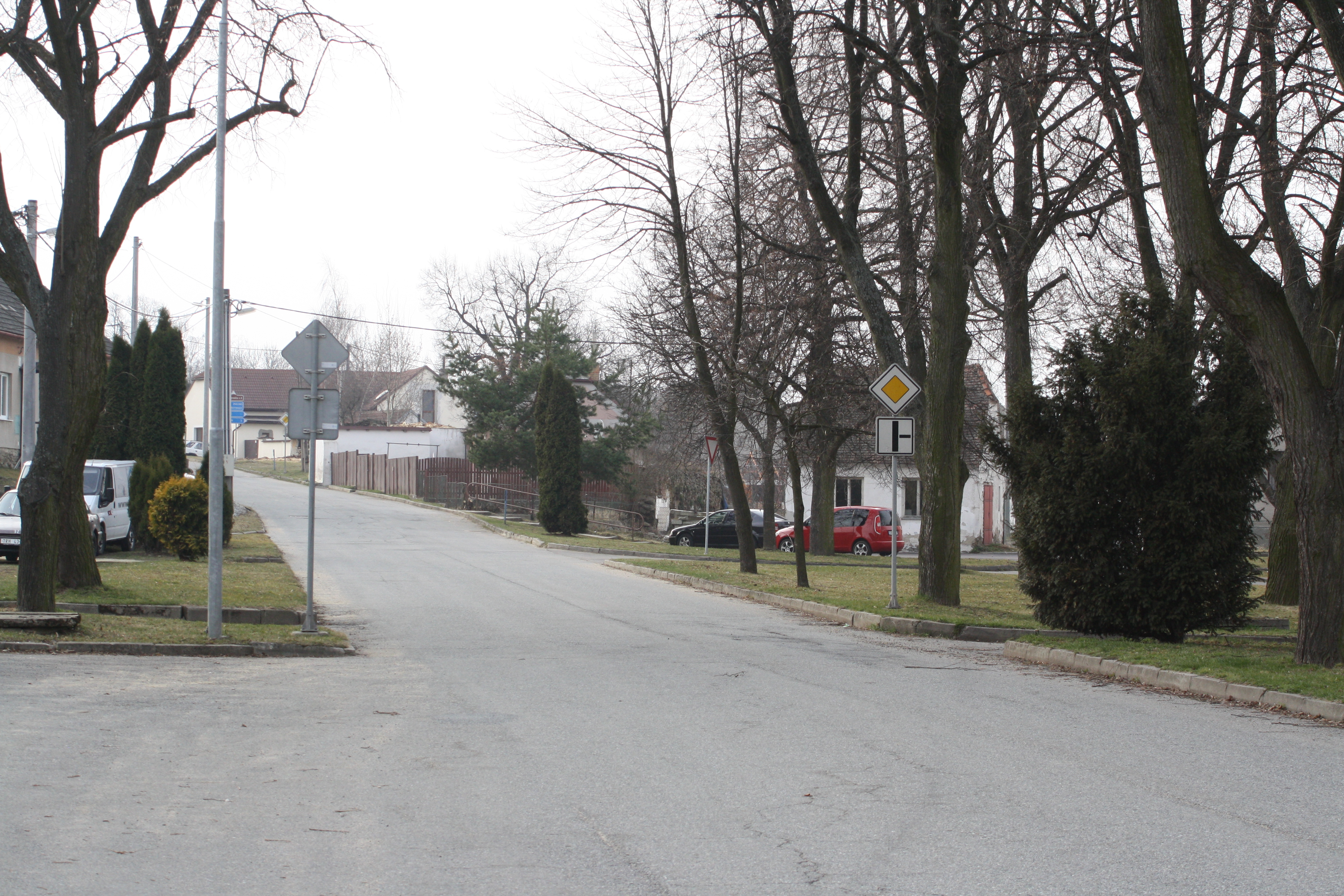
- Centre of Lipník

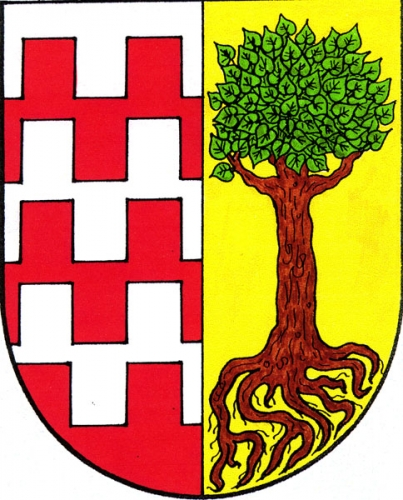
- Flag Coat of arms

- Location in the Czech Republic
- Coordinates: 49°8′39″N 15°57′2″E
- Country: Czech Republic
- Region: Vysočina
- District: Třebíč
- First mentioned: 1237

Area
  - Total: 5.14 km^{2} (1.98 sq mi)
- Elevation: 482 m (1,581 ft)

Population (2026-01-01)
  - Total: 426
  - Density: 82.9/km^{2} (215/sq mi)
- Time zone: UTC+1 (CET)
  - Summer (DST): UTC+2 (CEST)
- Postal code: 675 52
- Website: www.obeclipnik.cz

Lipník is a municipality and village in Třebíč District in the Vysočina Region of the Czech Republic. It has about 400 inhabitants.

Lipník lies approximately 11 kilometres (7 mi) south-east of Třebíč, 39 kilometres (24 mi) south-east of Jihlava, and 153 kilometres (95 mi) south-east of Prague.

== Demographics ==
Historical population
Year	Pop.	±%
1869	348	—
1880	331	−4.9%
1890	354	+6.9%
1900	393	+11.0%
1910	464	+18.1%
1921	415	−10.6%
1930	398	−4.1%
1950	333	−16.3%
1961	350	+5.1%
1970	359	+2.6%
1980	351	−2.2%
1991	331	−5.7%
2001	309	−6.6%
2011	380	+23.0%
2021	387	+1.8%
Source: Censuses

== Notable people ==
- Josef Hlouch (1902–1972), Roman Catholic prelate and theologian
