= Josef Antonín Hůlka =

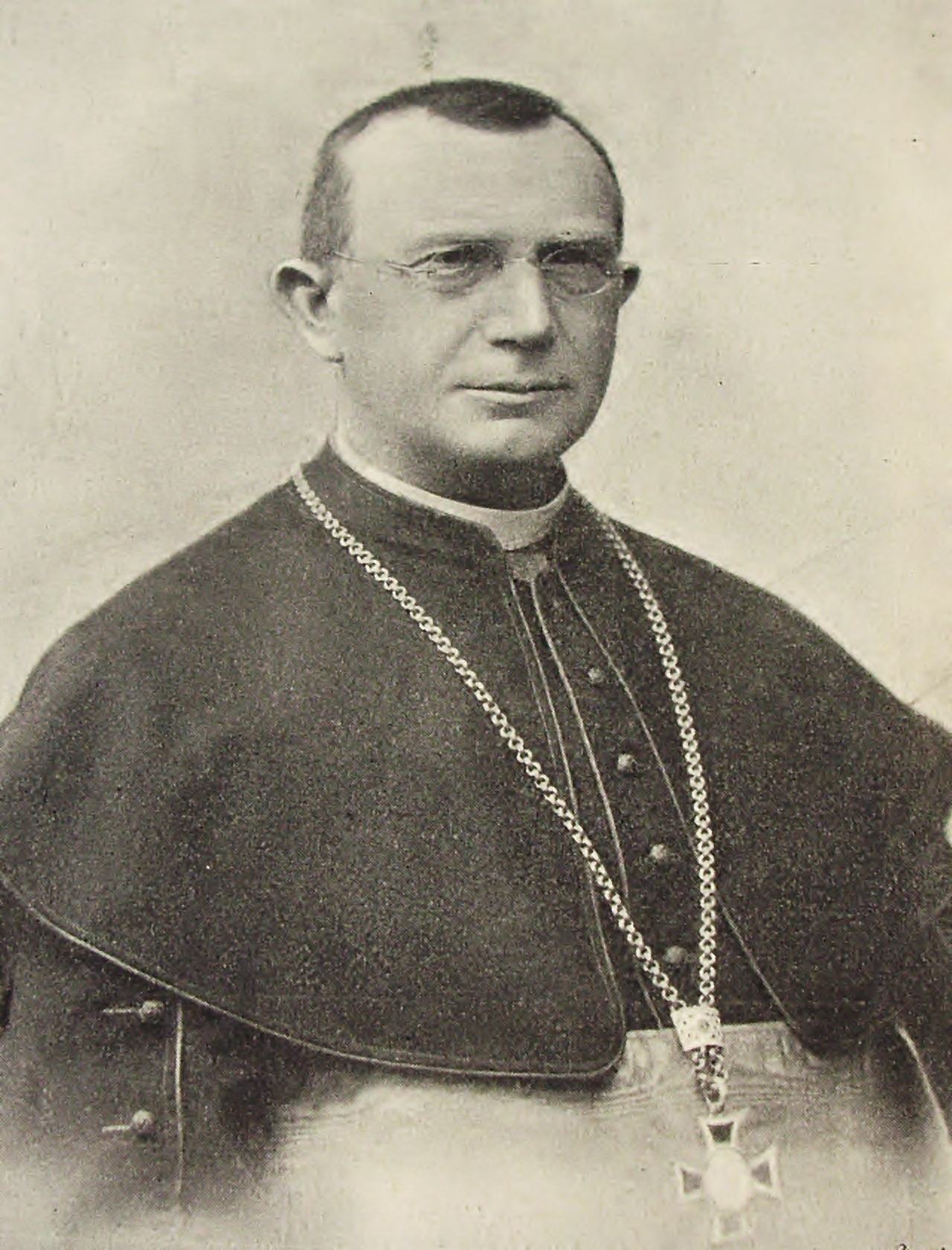
Josef Antonín Hůlka

Josef Antonín Hůlka (10 February 1851, Velenovy – 10 February 1920, České Budějovice) was a Czech Roman Catholic clergyman. He was ordained priest on 18 July 1875 in České Budějovice, later becoming one of its canons. He was nominated its bishop on 4 December 1907 by Francis Joseph I of Austria, a nomination confirmed by Pope Pius X twelve days later. He was consecrated bishop on 6 January 1908.

== Sources ==
- http://www.catholic-hierarchy.org/bishop/bhulka.html
- http://www.bcb.cz/Dieceze/Dieceze/Biskupove
