= Šimon Bárta =

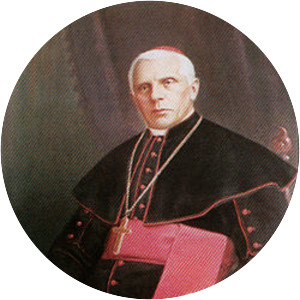
Šimon Bárta

Šimon Bárta (27 October 1864, Žimutice – 2 May 1940, České Budějovice) was a Czech Roman Catholic bishop.

== Life ==
Bárta was ordained priest on 16 March 1889 in Rome. After acting as chaplain at Sedlice for a time, he worked as a catechist in České Budějovice and Pelhřimov. After the death of the previous bishop of České Budějovice, on 16 December 1920 Pope Benedict XV appointed Barta as his successor. He was consecrated bishop on 20 February 1921 in the cathedral at České Budějovice by František Kordač, bishop of Prague. In 1938 the Munich Agreement removed Sudetenland from Czechoslovakia. Most of the Germans in that territory were initially managed via an Episcopal Commissariat and with effect from 1 January 1940 the parts of the diocese of České Budějovice lying across the border were divided between the German dioceses of Linz, St. Pölten, Passau and Regensburg, with their diocesan bishops acting as administrators for them. This effectively suspended the diocese of České Budějovice – after Bárta's death it remained vacant until 1947.
