= Jan Prokop Schaaffgotsche =

- Bishop of České Budĕjovice
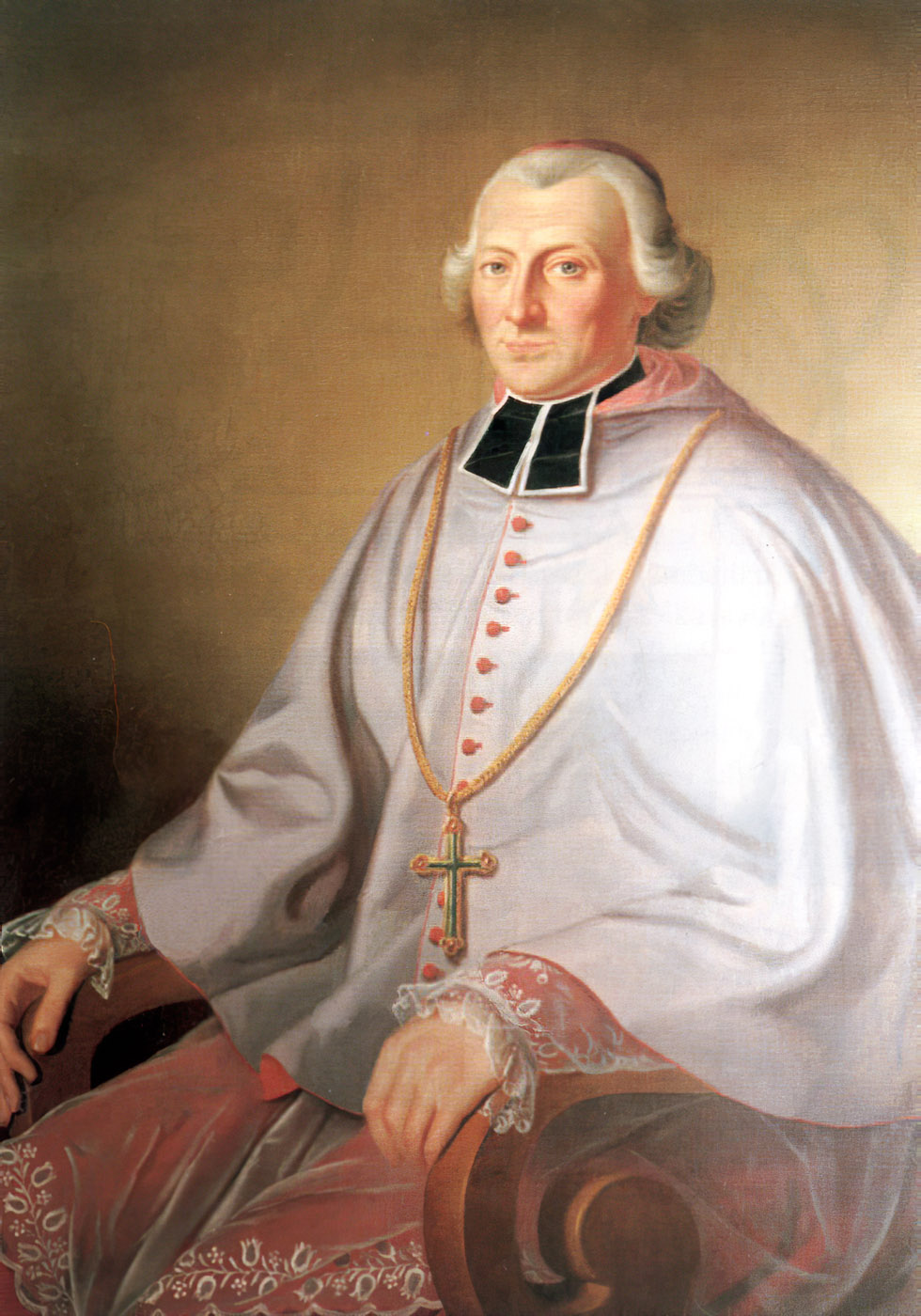
- Jan Prokop Schaaffgotsche
- Church: Catholic Church
- Diocese: Diocese of České Budĕjovice
- In office: 26 September 1785 – 8 May 1813
- Predecessor: Position Established
- Successor: Arnošt Konstantin Růžička

Orders
- Ordination: 25 May 1771
- Consecration: 11 December 1785 by Antonín Petr Příchovský z Příchovic

Personal details
- Born: 22 May 1748 Prague, Kingdom of Bohemia, Holy Roman Empire
- Died: 8 May 1813 (aged 64) České Budějovice, Kingdom of Bohemia, Austrian Empire

Jan Prokop Schaaffgotsche (German: Johann Prokop von Schaffgotsch; fully with all titles Johann Prokop Graf von Schaffgotsch Freiherr von Kynast und Greiffenstein; 22 May 1748, Prague – 8 May 1813, České Budějovice) was a Roman Catholic clergyman and bishop. He was an auxiliary bishop in Prague and the first bishop of České Budějovice.

== Books ==
- Arkadiusz Kuzio-Podrucki: Schaffgotschowie. Dzieje wielkiego rodu z Europy Środkowej, Katowice 2024, ISBN 978-8367152-61-7. (polish)
