= Vlastimil Kročil =

Czech clergyman, Bishop of České Budějovice

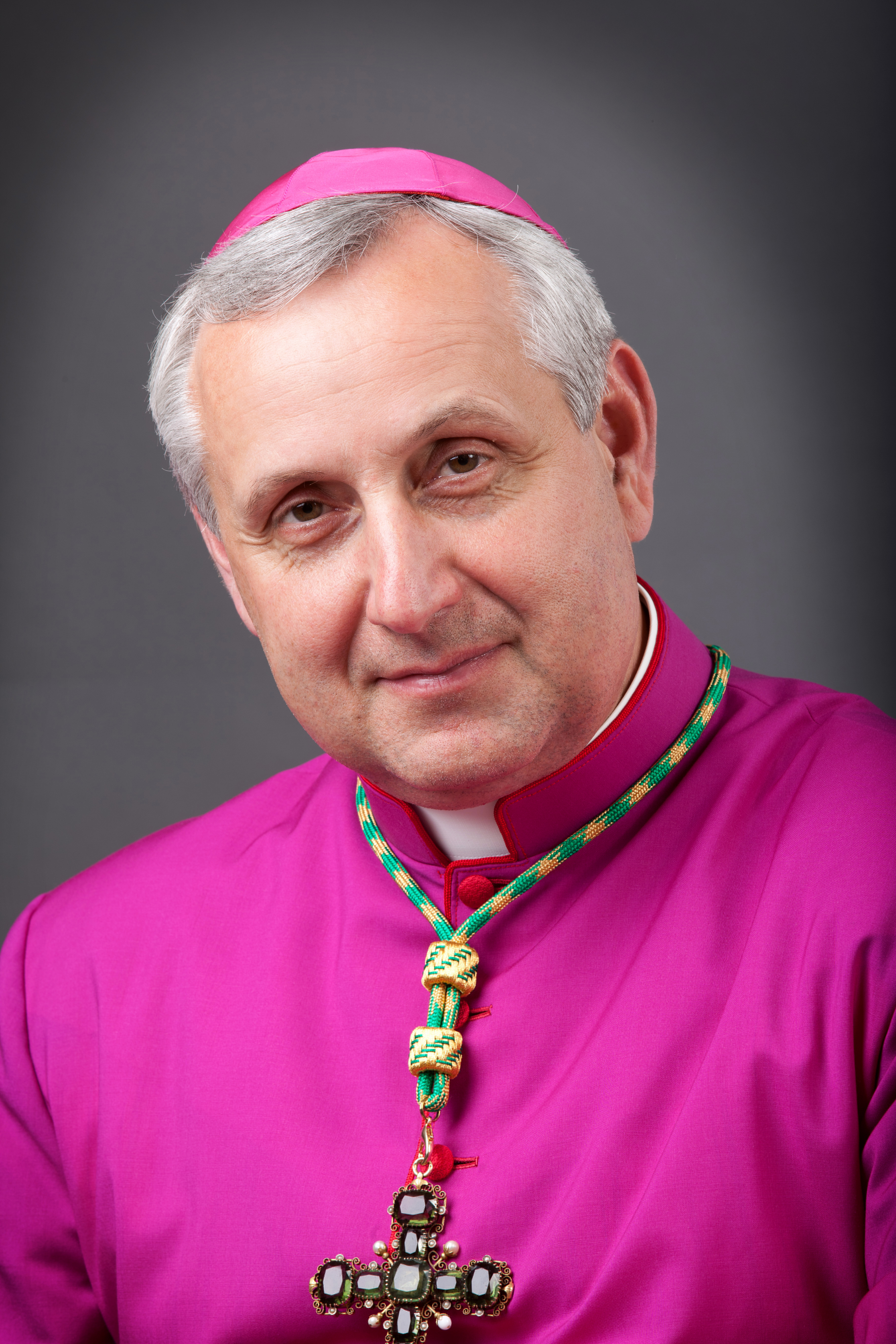
- Church: Catholic
- Province: česká církevní
- Diocese: Diocese of České Budĕjovice
- Appointed: 19 March 2015

Orders
- Ordination: 13 June 2015 by Pope Francis
- Consecration: by Dominik Jaroslav Cardinal Duka, O.P.

Personal details
- Born: 10 May 1961 (age 65) Brno, Czechoslovakia
- Education: Pontifical Lateran University (1988–1993); Pontifical Gregorian University (1993–1996)
- Coat of arms

Vlastimil Kročil (born 10 May 1961) is a Czech Roman Catholic clergyman and the Bishop of České Budějovice.

== Life ==
Kročil was born in Brno on 10 May 1961. After graduating in 1986 he was rejected three times for the Theological Faculty in Litoměřice. He moved to Italy, where he studied at the Pontifical Lateran University (1988–1993) and the Pontifical Gregorian University (1993–1996). He was ordained priest on 16 July 1994 and named Bishop of České Budějovice on 19 March 2015 by Pope Francis.
