= Kácov =

- Market town
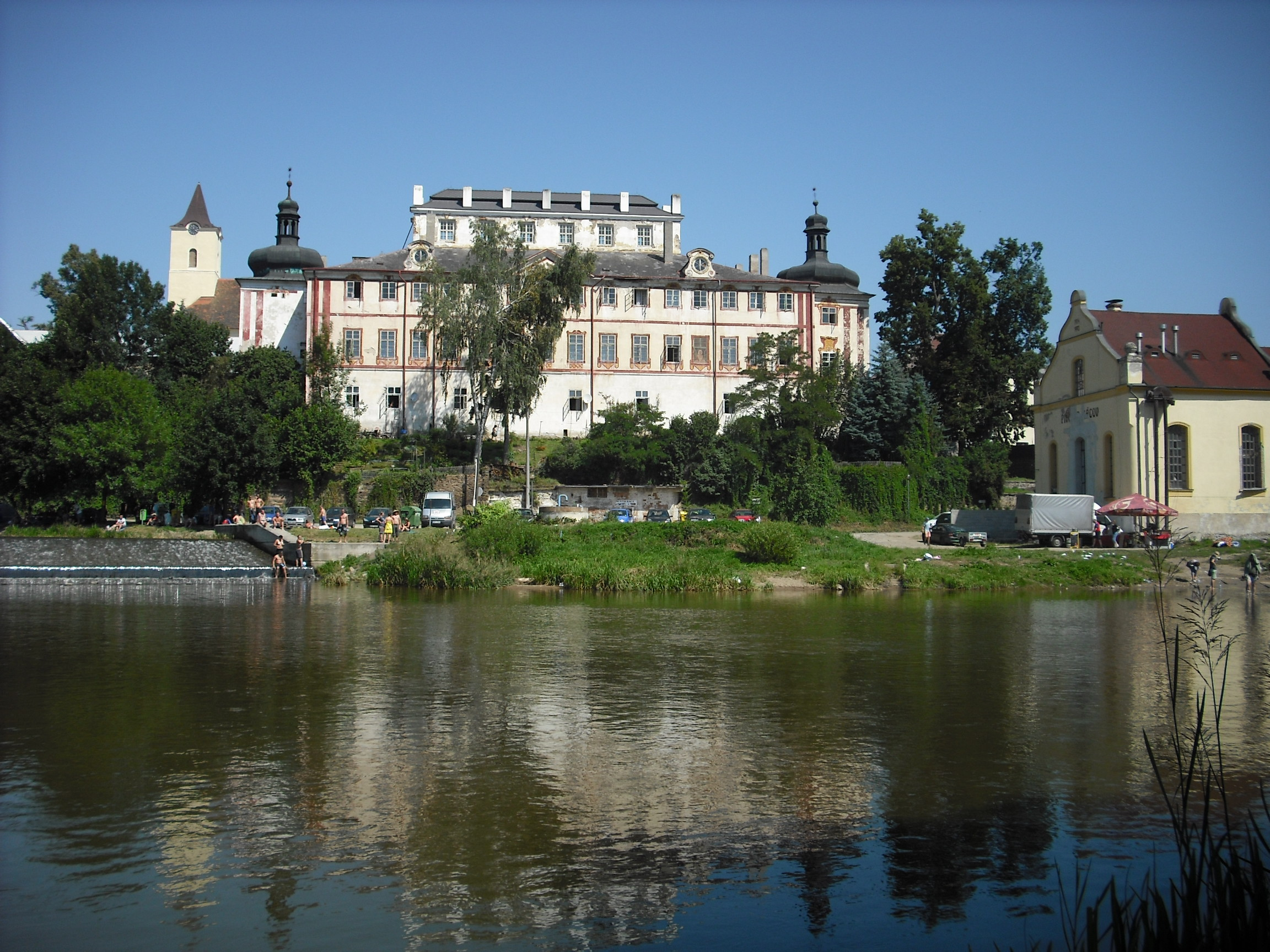
- Kácov Castle behind the Sázava River

- Flag Coat of arms

- Location in the Czech Republic
- Coordinates: 49°46′41″N 15°1′41″E
- Country: Czech Republic
- Region: Central Bohemian
- District: Kutná Hora
- First mentioned: 1318

Area
  - Total: 11.10 km^{2} (4.29 sq mi)
- Elevation: 332 m (1,089 ft)

Population (2026-01-01)
  - Total: 812
  - Density: 73.2/km^{2} (189/sq mi)
- Time zone: UTC+1 (CET)
  - Summer (DST): UTC+2 (CEST)
- Postal code: 285 09
- Website: www.kacov.cz

Kácov (Czech pronunciation: [ˈkaːtsof]) is a market town in Kutná Hora District in the Central Bohemian Region of the Czech Republic. It has about 800 inhabitants.

== Administrative division ==
Kácov consists of five municipal parts (in brackets population according to the 2021 census):

- Kácov (636)
- Račíněves (67)
- Zderadinky (17)
- Zderadiny (32)
- Zliv (44)

== Etymology ==
The name is derived from the personal name Kác, meaning "Kác's (court)".

== Geography ==
Kácov is located about 25 kilometres (16 mi) southwest of Kutná Hora and 46 km (29 mi) southeast of Prague. It lies mostly in the Vlašim Uplands. The southeastern part of the municipal territory extends into the Upper Sázava Hills. The highest point is at 475 m (1,558 ft) above sea level. The market town proper is situated in a meander of the Sázava River.

== History ==
The first written mention of Kácov is from 1318.

== Demographics ==
Historical population

Year	Pop.	±%
1869	1,442	—
1880	1,398	−3.1%
1890	1,365	−2.4%
1900	1,416	+3.7%
1910	1,393	−1.6%

Year	Pop.	±%
1921	1,320	−5.2%
1930	1,367	+3.6%
1950	1,170	−14.4%
1961	1,281	+9.5%
1970	1,179	−8.0%

Year	Pop.	±%
1980	990	−16.0%
1991	911	−8.0%
2001	824	−9.5%
2011	779	−5.5%
2021	796	+2.2%

Source: Censuses

== Transport ==
Kácov is located on the railway line Čerčany–Ledeč nad Sázavou.

== Sights ==
Kácov is known for the Kácov Castle. It was built in the Baroque style in 1726–1733 for Duchess Anna Maria Franziska of Saxe-Lauenburg on the site of an older and smaller castle. Since 2008, it has been owned by the market town of Kácov and is open to the public.

The Church of the Nativity of the Virgin Mary was originally a Gothic church from the 14th century. It was rebuilt in the Baroque style in the first half of the 18th century, Empire style modifications were made in 1819. After being damaged by the wind in 1845, it was completely rebuilt in 1862.

== Notable people ==
- Jan Valerián Jirsík (1798–1883), Roman Catholic bishop
