= Diocese of České Budějovice =

Roman Catholic diocese in Czechia

Coordinates: 48.9753°N 14.4760°E

Diocese of České Budějovice Dioecesis Budovicensis Biskupství českobudějovické

Catholic
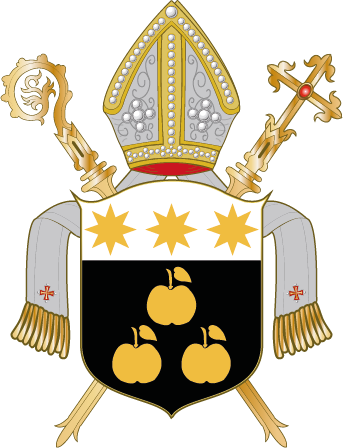

Location
- Country: Czech Republic
- Ecclesiastical province: Prague

Statistics
- Area: 12,500 km^{2} (4,800 sq mi)
- Population: Total; Catholics: (as of 2021); 750,860; 286,460 (38.2%)

Information
- Denomination: Catholic
- Sui iuris church: Latin Church
- Rite: Roman Rite
- Cathedral: Cathedral of St Nicholas

Current leadership
- Pope: Leo XIV
- Bishop: Vlastimil Kročil
- Metropolitan Archbishop: Jan Graubner
- Auxiliary Bishops: Pavel Posád

Map
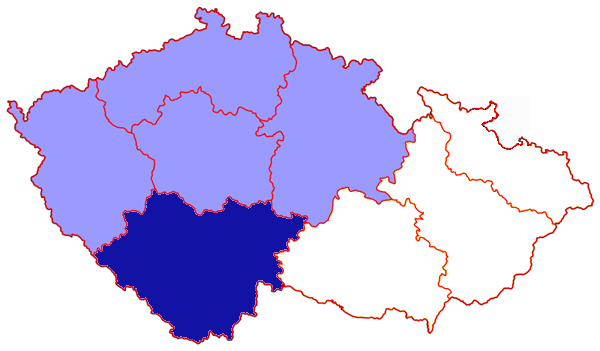

Website
- bcb.cz

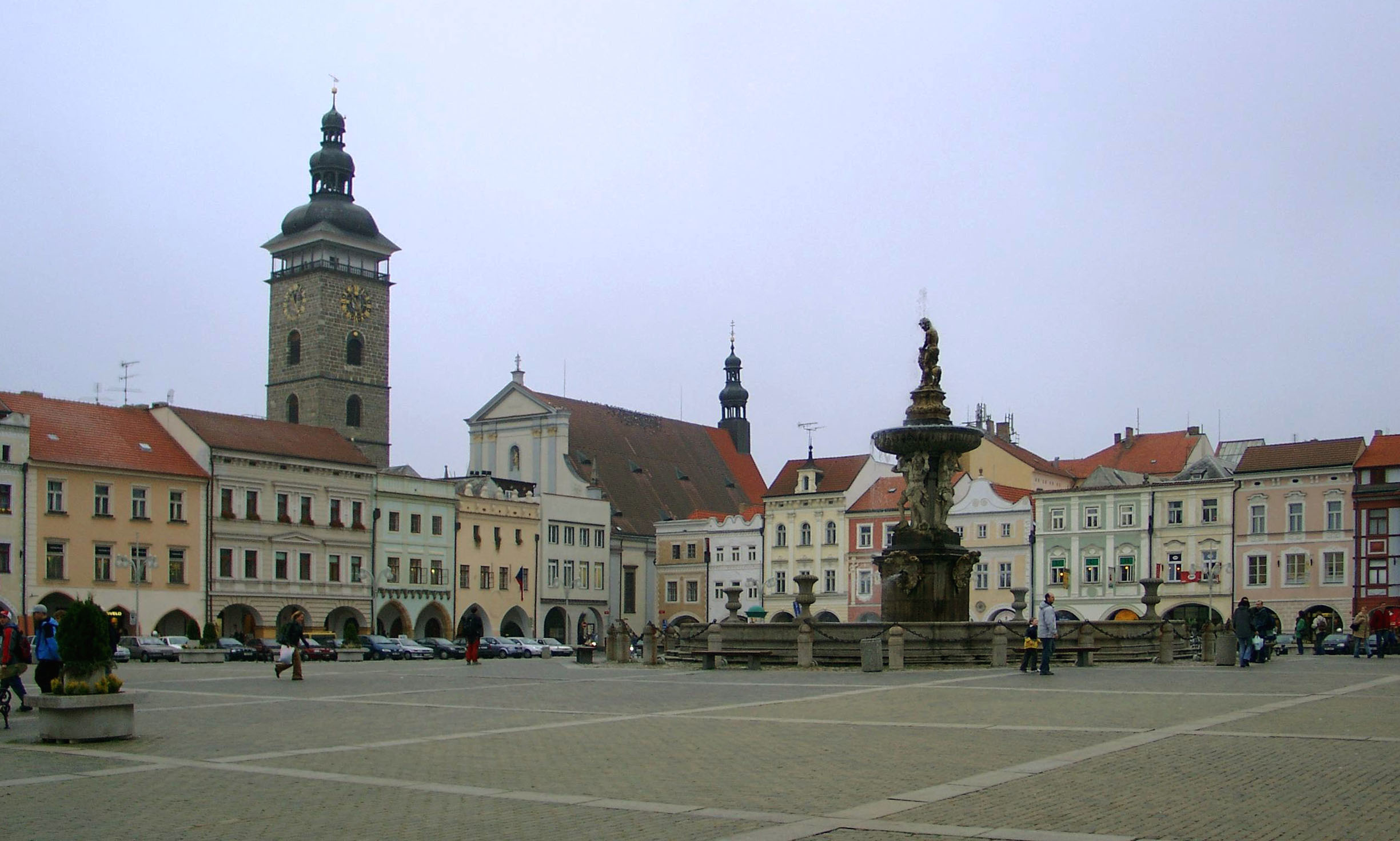
St. Nicholas cathedral

The Diocese of České Budějovice (Latin: Dioecesis Budovicensis) is a Latin diocese of the Catholic Church. It is situated almost entirely in Bohemia, with only small eastern section in Moravia. The diocese was founded on 20 September 1785, and its area is 12 500 km^{2}. Jan Prokop Schaaffgotsche was its first diocesan bishop and Vlastimil Kročil is its current bishop.

== Statistics ==
- Area: 12,500 square kilometres (4,800 sq mi)
- Residents/Catholics: 760,000/220,000
- Divisions: 11 vicarates, 361 parishes

== See also ==
- List of bishops of České Budějovice
- Reorganization of occupied dioceses during World War II
- St. Catherine of Boletice
