= Dominican Monastery =

Dominican Monastery may refer to:

- Dominican Monastery (České Budějovice)
- Dominican Monastery (Frankfurt)
- St. Catherine's Monastery, Tallinn, also known as Dominican Monastery
