= Madonna of Rudolfov =

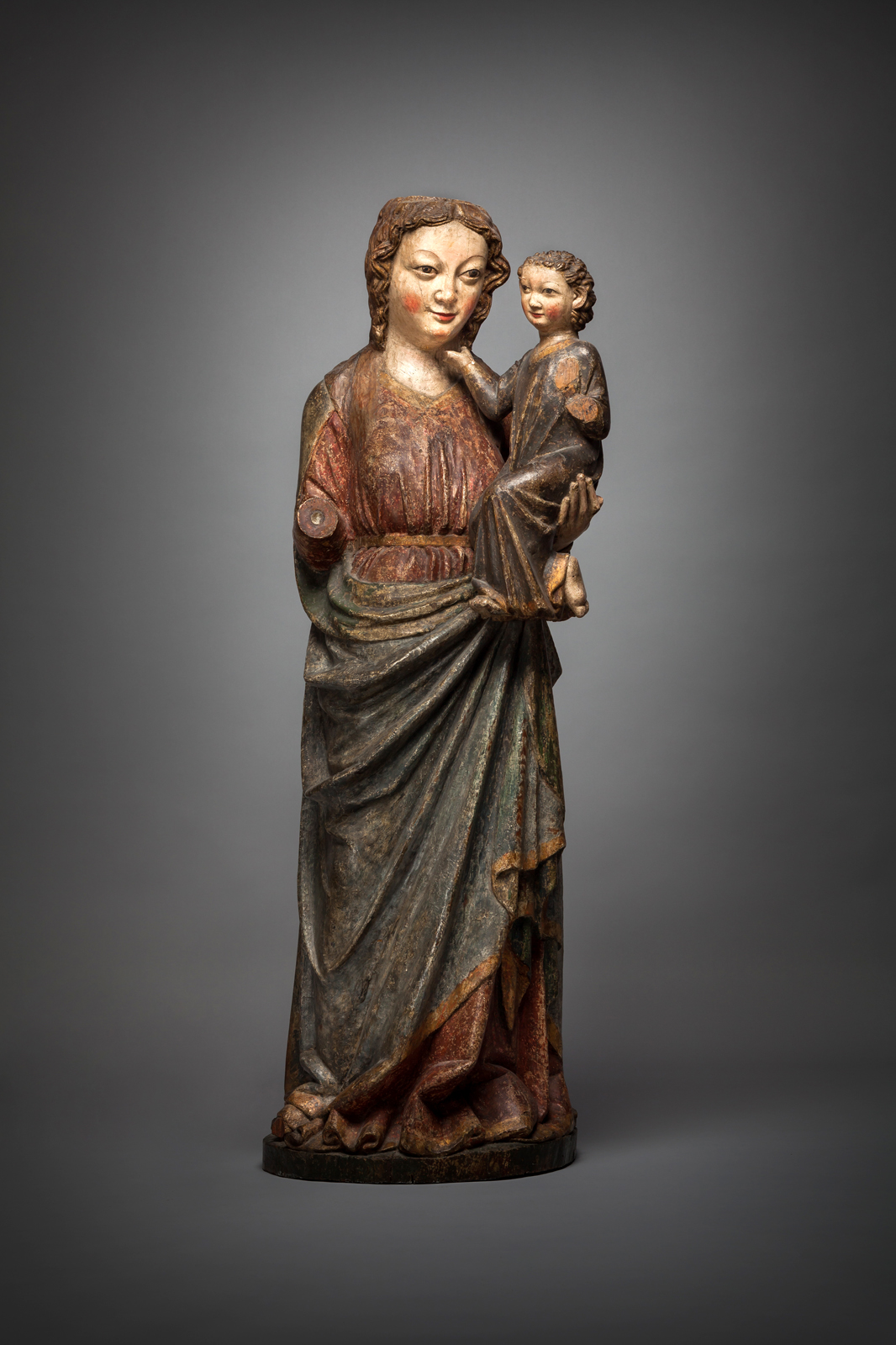
Madonna of Rudolfov (1274), Aleš South Bohemian Gallery in Hluboká nad Vltavou

The Madonna of Rudolfov is one of the most valuable monuments of early Gothic sculpture in Bohemia. It probably dates back to the end of the reign of Ottokar II of Bohemia, when the Dominican Church of the Presentation of the Blessed Virgin Mary in České Budějovice was consecrated in 1274. It is on display in the permanent exhibition of the Aleš South Bohemian Gallery in Hluboká nad Vltavou.

== History ==
The statue was found by Vladimír Denkstein in 1937 in the former Lutheran church in Rudolfov, dating from the 16th century. The statue was donated by the Dominicans or the Capuchins of České Budějovice before 1689 at the time of the Recatholization. It was acquired for the Aleš South Bohemian Gallery collection in 1956 as a replacement for a plaster copy, but the donation contract could not be found and it remains in the exhibition only as a loan of the parish of Rudolfov.

== Description and classification ==
A fir wood statue, hollowed out at the back, with the original polychromy of face preserved. Missing are parts of the Madonna's right hand, which probably held the scepter, the left hand of the Infant Jesus, and the veil that covered part of the Madonna's head. A groove for the crown is noticeable around the cut top of the statue. The height of the statue is 141 cm. The original polychromy of the drapery, which has been partially preserved under later layers of paint, was different - Mary wore a crimson red dress decorated with a golden border around the neckline and a blue cloak with a green lining, while Jesus wore a coral red chemise. The statue was restored by Prof. Bohuslav Slánský in 1946–1948.

The monumental and static conception of the statue is related to the stone sculptures of the French cathedrals of Reims and Amiens, whose style spread to German lands in the 13th century. Madona of Rudolfov is related to the Saxon-Duringian area, especially the Magdeburg and Naumburg circle. This corresponds to the style of drapery on the right side, the arrangement of the folds of the lower hem of the cloak and the organic conception of the relationship between the body and the robe. The dress is girded with a golden belt that emphasizes the plasticity of the body and creates regular vertical folds on the breasts. The folds of the cloak, which flow from the shoulders to the ground, converge on the left side towards the baby Jesus, who thus forms the ideological centre of gravity of the sculpture. The Madonna is leaning towards the baby Jesus on her left side, and her slightly bent right free leg with its extended toe looms beneath the garment. The gesture of the baby Jesus stroking his mother's chin with his right hand is of Byzantine origin. It is not just an expression of childish playfulness, but points to the Virgin Mary as the intermediary of grace and may be a representation of Christ's statement on the Cross, "Behold your Mother", referring to his redemptive death. The child's bare feet are also symbolic, alluding to Christ's later sacrifice.

Opinions vary on the dating of the work. According to some formal features (the bowl-shaped folds of the drapery on the right side), the work can be dated at the end of the 13th century, but the gesture of the baby Jesus (identically also the Strakonice Madonna) refers to the new style, which is characterized by verticality and de-materialisation.

=== Details ===
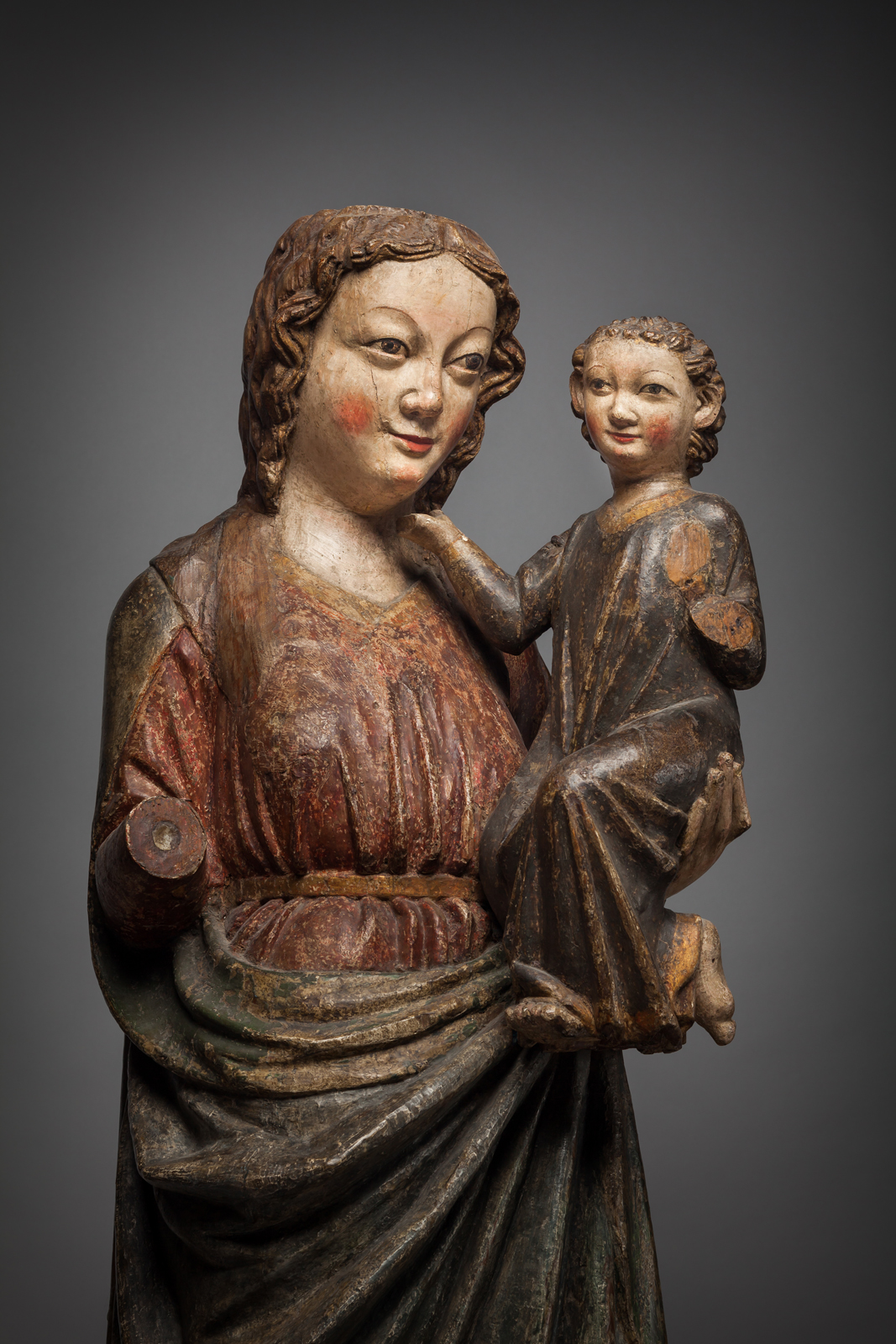

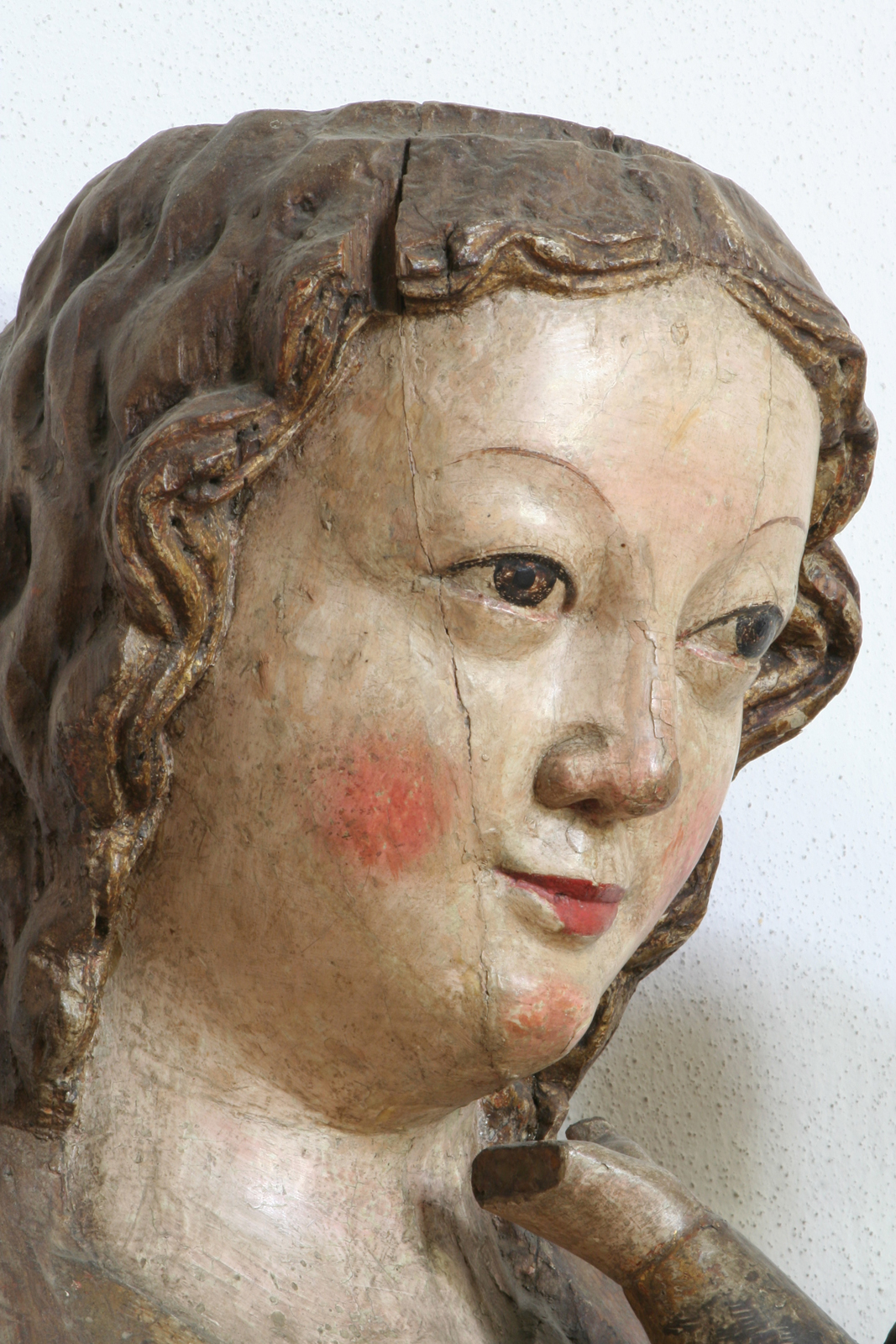

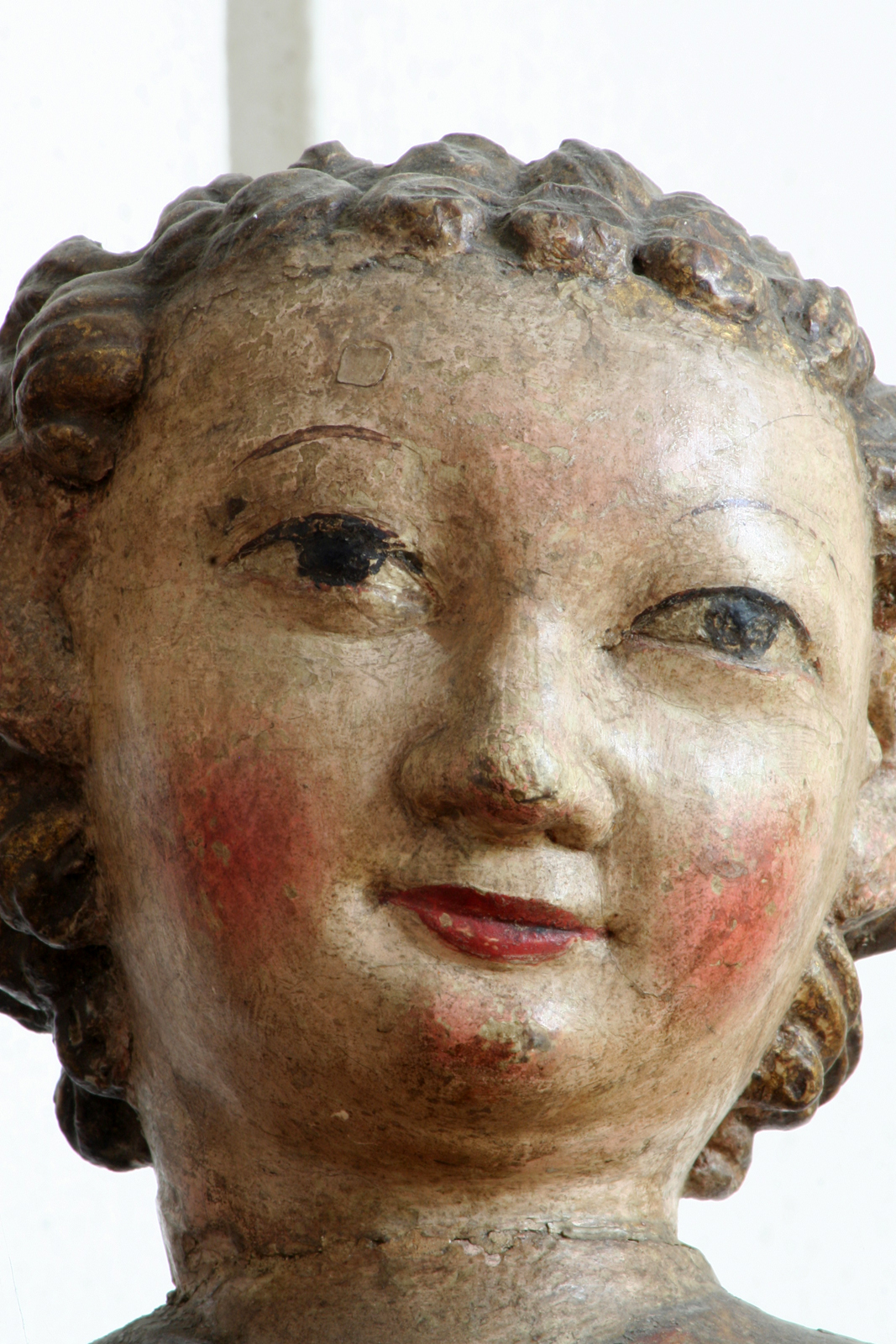

=== Related works ===
- Madonna from Březenec near Chomutov
- Strakonice Madonna
- Madonna from Rouchovany
- Madonna of Klentnice (1310)
- Madonna of Straubing (around 1300)
- Throned Mother of God (1290), Nuremberg
- Madonna of Spandau (1290), Berlin
- Madonna of Cáhlov (Freistadt) (1270-1280)
- Madonna of Klosterneuburg
- Madonna of the Minorite Monastery, Wiener Neustädt (1310)
- Madonna of the Admont of Styria
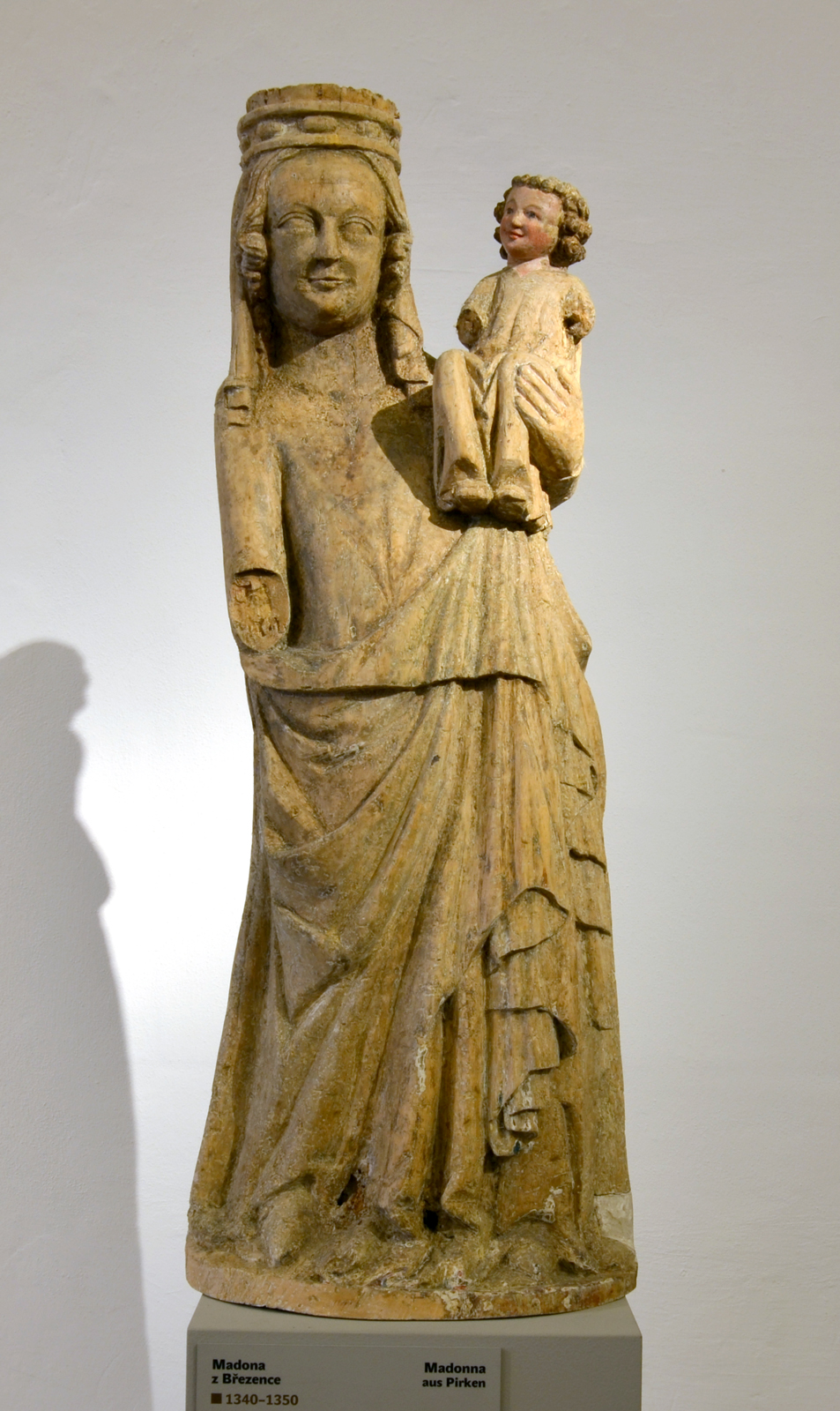
Madonna of Březenec (1340-1350), Bishopric of Litoměřice

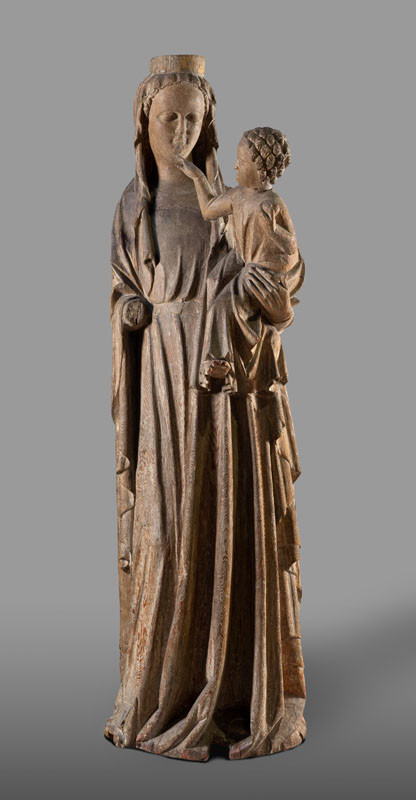
Strakonice Madonna, Anonym - Bohemia (around 1300–1320), National Gallery Prague

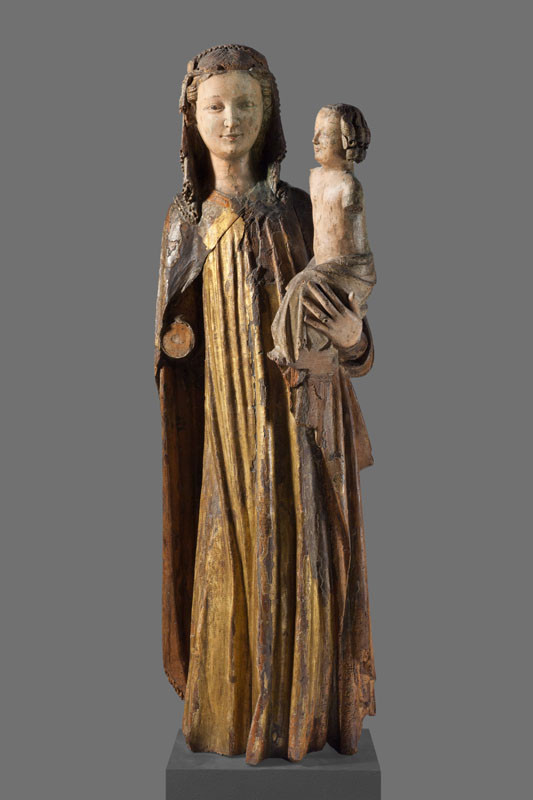
Madonna from Rouchovany, Anonym - Bohemia (around 1300–1330), National Gallery Prague

== Sources ==
- Hynek Látal et al., Meziprůzkumy. AJG Collection 1300–2016, AJG 2016, ISBN 978-80-87799-52-9
- Klára Schmidtová, Madonna of Rudolfov - stylistic contexts and the question of dating, Bachelor thesis, Faculty of Arts and UDU, University of South Bohemia in České Budějovice, 2014 On line
- Roman Lavička: Gothic Art, Guide to the Collection of Medieval Art of the AJG, 71 p., Hluboká n. Vlt. 2007, ISBN 978-80-86952-54-3
- Aleš Mudra, Chapters on the origins of the carving tradition in Central Europe, Prague 2006, p. 85.
- Hynek Rulíšek, Gothic Art of South Bohemia, Guide, vol. 3, Alšova jihočeská galerie v Hluboká nad Vltavou 1989, ISBN 80-900057-6-4
- Hynek Rulíšek, Gothic Art in South Bohemia, National Gallery in Prague 1989, ISBN 80-7035-013-X
- Marie Anna Kotrbová, Czech Gothic Madonnas, Prague, Charita 1985. loose sheets, 15 leaves.
- Vladimír Denkstein, František Matouš, South Bohemian Gothic, Prague 1953, p. 42.
- Vladimír Denkstein, Madonna of Rudolfov, in: O. J. Blažíček (ed.), Paths of Art. A collection of works in honour of Antonín Matějček's sixtieth birthday, Prague 1949, pp. 98–102.
- Albert Kutal, Dobroslav Líbal, Antonín Matějček, Czech Gothic Art I., Prague 1949, p. 48.
