= Church of the Presentation of the Blessed Virgin Mary (České Budějovice) =

Church in České Budějovice, Czech Republic

Coordinates: 48.976°N 14.472°E

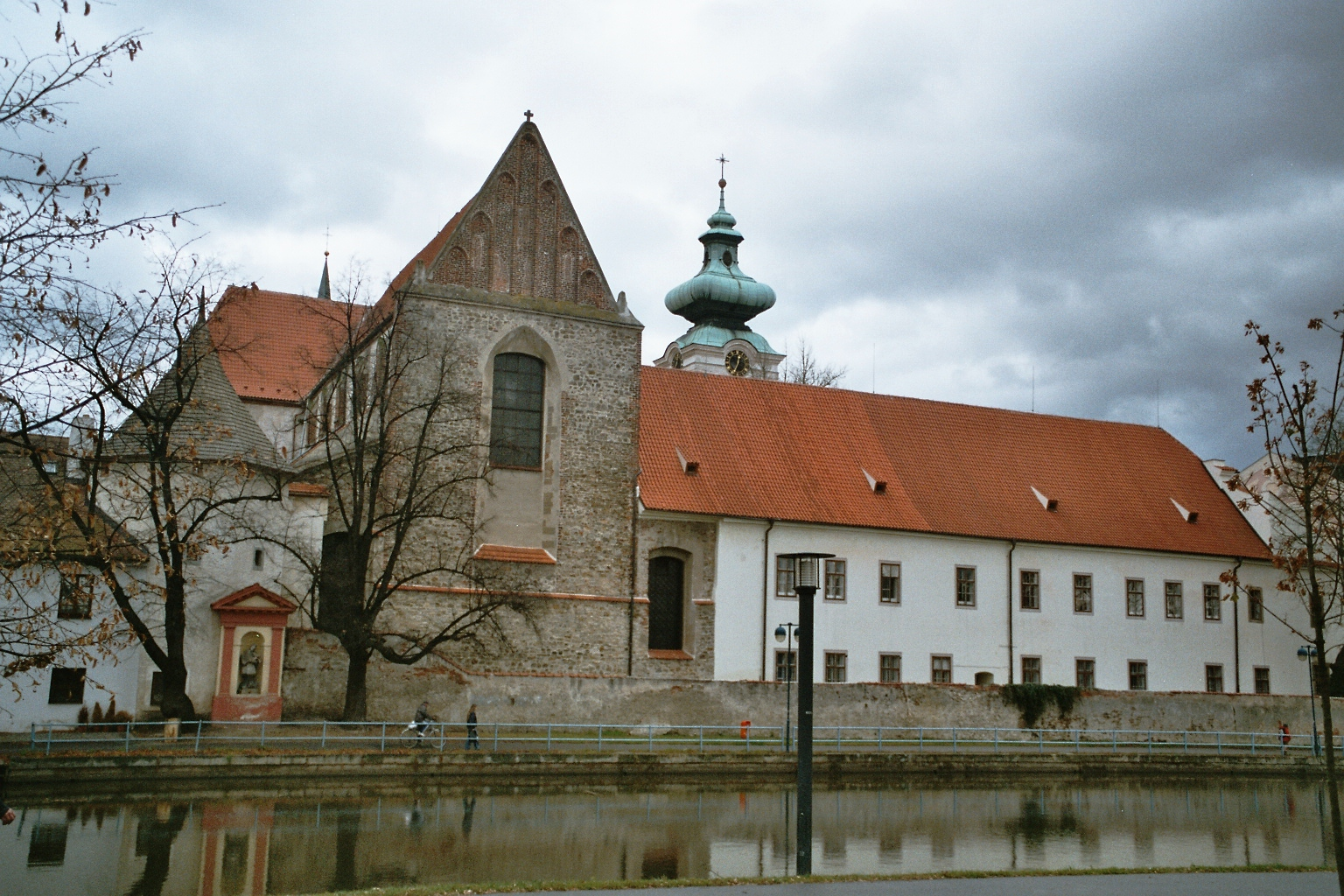
Church of the Sacrifice of the Virgin Mary (backside)

Church of the Sacrifice of the Virgin Mary (Czech: Kostel Obětování Panny Marie) is a church located on Piaristic square in České Budějovice, Czech Republic. The church was founded at the same time as the city of České Budějovice in 1265; initial construction was completed around 1300. It is a monumental Gothic building with Baroque and Rococo additions and unique medieval fresco paintings.

== Exterior ==
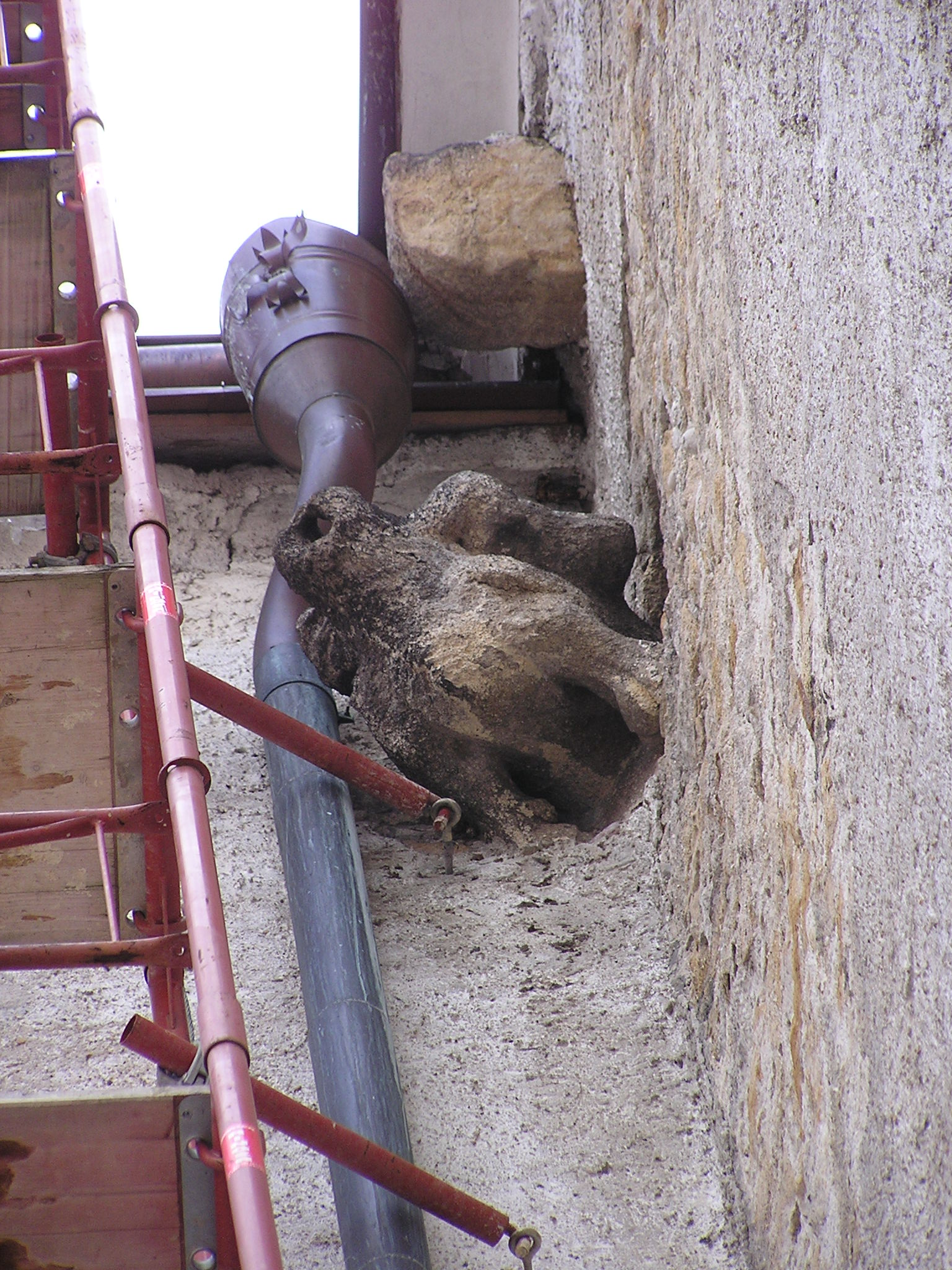
The frog

In spite of numerous rebuildings of the church, convent buildings and the cloister, the exterior of the church is preserved in the early Gothic style. Lanced windows have the typical Gothic tracery- circled three-leaves, divided into two parts which are ended by rosettes. Massive supporting columns with no decoration ended in the isosceles triangle protrude to the exterior. The eastern frontage and the lanced niche with smaller window are the part of town fortifications. Seven former decorative niches, typical for the early Gothic churches are maintained on the peak.

There is placed the frog from stone under the roof. According to the legend, when the frog reaches the top of the roof the end of the world comes.

== Interior ==
The interior of the church is preserved in former early Gothic style with small Baroque complements in the eastern part. The three-nave basilica church with the embedded transept and the southern entrance is connected by two portals to the cloister. Low aisles are divided from the nave by six pairs of columns. There is a cross vault with profiled ribs in seven bays. On the side which is opened to the nave the profile of ribs continues to the ground while on other sides ribs are ended by simple supports. On the southern wall former consoles with vegetable motives can be seen. The vault of the nave is also cross, and it is divided into ten bays and there is one with five bays above the chancel. Keystones in naves are decorated. On brackets of ribs different human heads are represented instead of vegetable motives in the nave.

== Decoration ==
There are extremely valuable murals, date back to 14th century, in the church. The unique one is the dual-mural in niche which is opposite to the southern entrance in the direction of transept: older part shows the painting of the holy Virgin, the Christ and knelt donator. On the left from the niche there is situated the biggest mural in the Czech Republic- the mural of the Saint Christopher which has almost 10 metres.

== Chapels ==
The oldest chapel is probably a Gothic chapel of Margaret the Virgin. King Ottokar II of Bohemia grounded the chapel in 1267 and in 1633 earl Baltasar Marradas rebuilt the chapel as the Marian chapel. There was placed the picture of Virgin Mary of České Budějovice from the 15th century. The Gothic chorale chapel is also meant in sources. Nowadays chapels are not preserved, they broken down during the rebuilt of the monastery which started in 1885.

The chapel of Saint George together with the monastery's library were the only objects of the whole monastery which were not damaged during the fire in 1381. The Czech chapel was established on the first floor of former belfry which dates back to 15th century. The chapel is preserved but there is not public access.

Nowadays smaller baroque chapel abuts to the southern wall of the church.

== Gallery ==
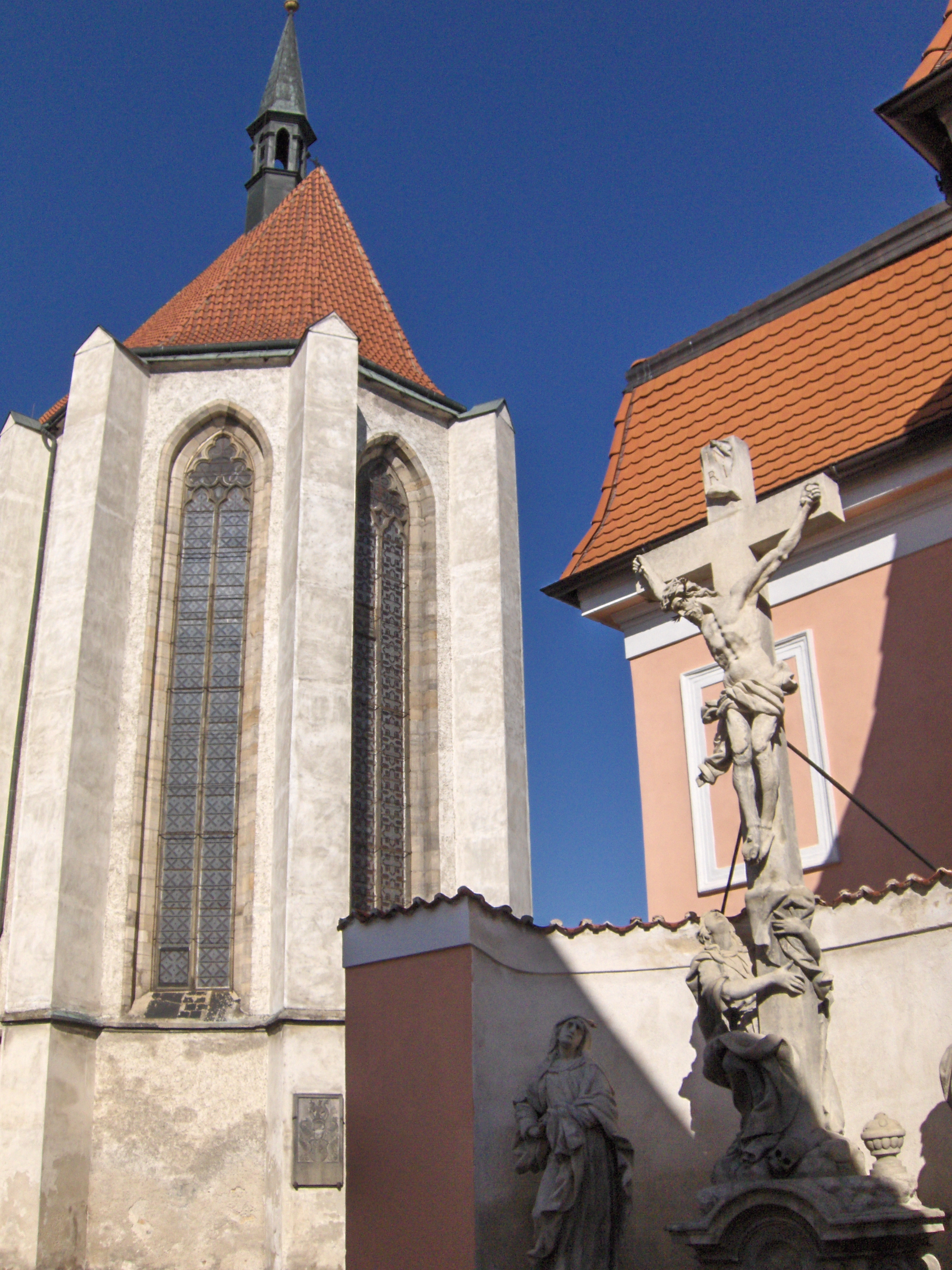

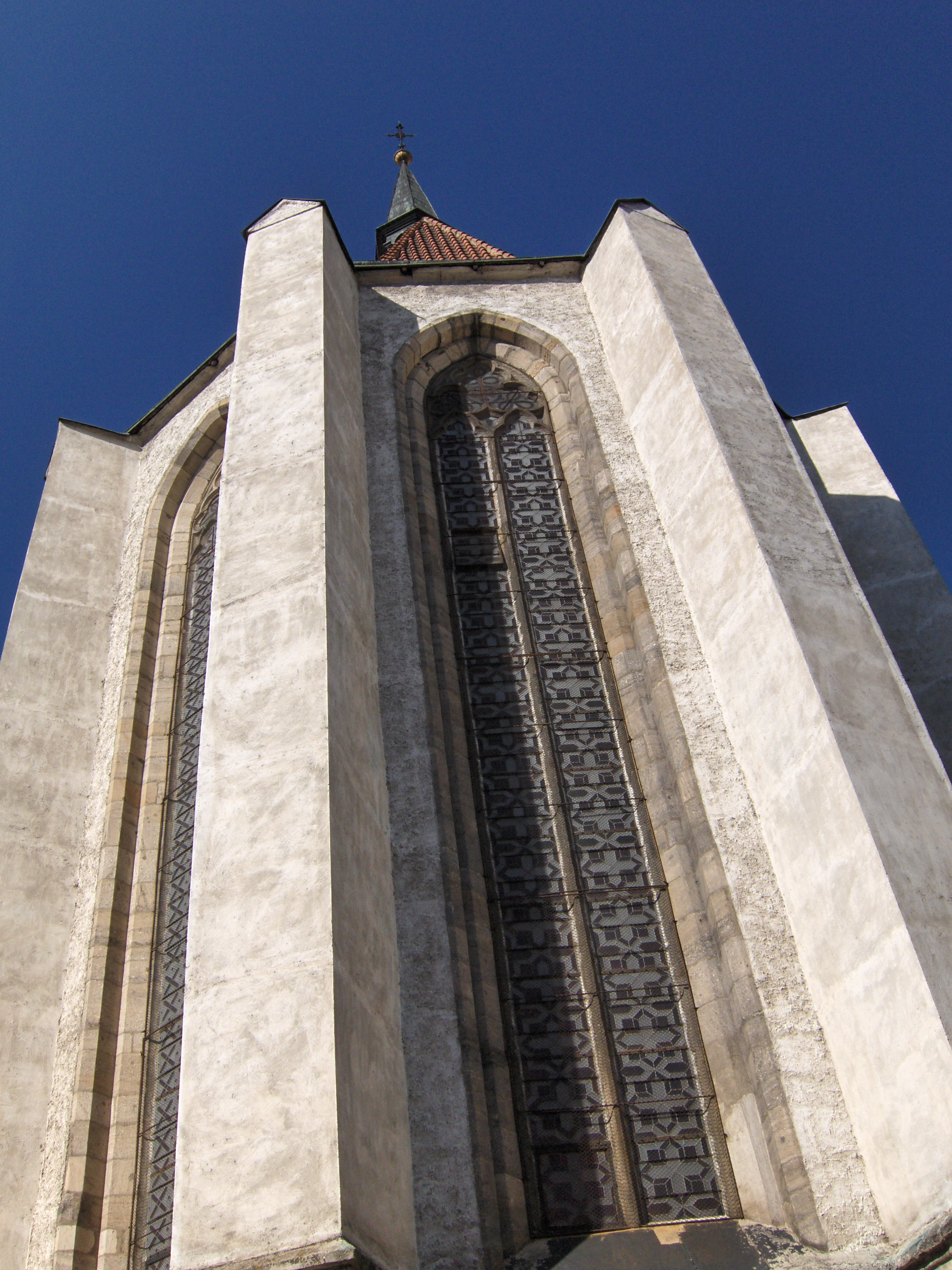

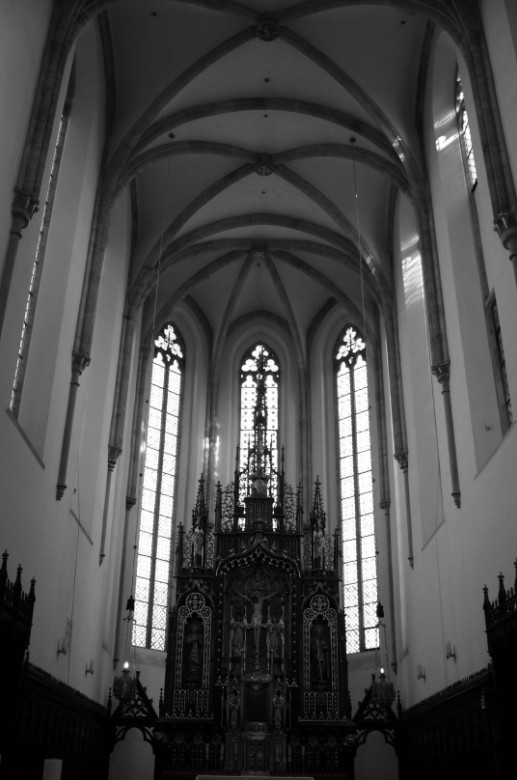

== See also ==
- Dominican Monastery (České Budějovice)
- Madonna of Rudolfov
