= Strakonice Madonna =

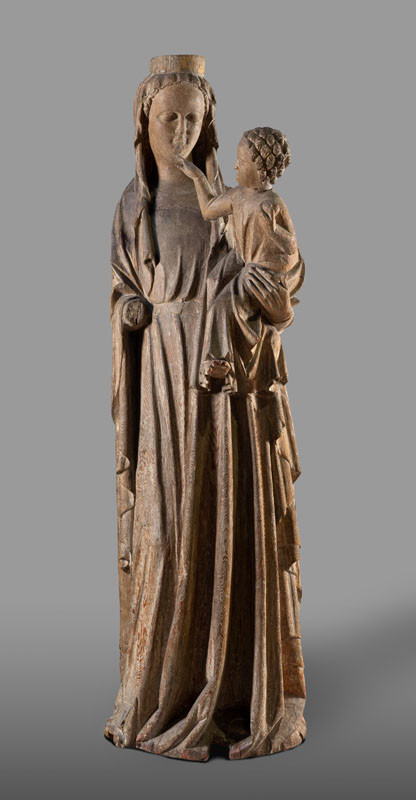
Strakonice Madonna (1300-1330, National Gallery in Prague

The Strakonice Madonna (c. 1300-1330) is a Gothic wooden sculpture of the Madonna and Child of about 1300-1330. It comes from the Johannite Commandry in Strakonice that was founded in 1243. It is a rare surviving early Gothic sculpture that is directly related to French or Rhineland cathedral sculpture of the 13th century. It is exhibited in the permanent collection of medieval art at the National Gallery in Prague.

== Description and classification ==
It is a fully plastic sculpture made of fir wood, hollowed on the backside, with small remnants of polychromy. It is 184 cm high. The head and hand of the child are made of limewood. The sculpture was purchased for the National Gallery in Prague in 1947.

The compositional type of the Madonna with an open cloak is derived from French cathedral sculpture (the cathedral portal in Rheims, 1230-1233), from where it spread through the Rhineland and Germany to central Europe. This connection with cathedral sculpture is the basis for the Strakonice Madonna’s clearly arranged and perfectly balanced composition, for the purity and sophistication of its forms as well as for the refinement and cultivated character of its physical gestures. With the compactness of its mass, simplicity and abstract plasticity, the Strakonice Madonna anticipates a new conception of sculpture in the 14th century.

The Strakonice Madonna has no close parallels in German sculpture and is considered to have been made in Bohemia. This is suggested by a certain rigidness of movement and the block-based character of the sculptural working. Mary’s head reacts only imperceptibly to the movement of her body and her face wears the expression of an immobile mask. The sculpture was originally covered with polychromy that could have substantially enlivened her face. The austere nature of the sculpture is lightened by the gesture of the child and his tunic that is looser and pleated with greater movement. The loving gesture of the Infant Jesus, who touches his mother’s chin with a finger of his right hand, is interpreted as a reference to medieval mysticism in the ‘Song of Songs’. In the ‘Song of Songs’, Mary represents the personification of the Church and both the mother and bride of Christ. An interesting example of the use of Marian veneration can be seen in the uncovered left leg of the Infant Jesus that might have been fixed to a movable pivot. The child’s bare foot is an allusion to Christ’s subsequent sacrifice.

According to Homolka, this sculpture has much in common with the decoration of the vestibule of Freiburg Minster as well as with the west façade of Strasbourg Cathedral. The Strakonice Madonna dates from the period of post-classical Gothic, which was oriented towards linear stylisation and vertically composed, block-based form. This period is represented, for example, by the sculptures of the west façade and north transept of Rheims Cathedral. In Germany, this line is represented by the Naumburg Master (second quarter of the 13th century) and by the Erminold Master (1380s). The Madonna of St Goëry in Épinal or the building workshop in Bamberg could have been the starting point for Rhineland sculpture.

The sculpture might have been commissioned by Bavor III (died 1318), owner of the Strakonice manor, supporter of Elizabeth Stuart, Queen of Bohemia and burgrave at the construction of the royal Zvíkov Castle, from where he summoned builders and stonemasons to the construction of Strakonice Castle.

== Related works ==
- The Madonna of Rudolfov (1274), Aleš South Bohemian Gallery in Hluboká nad Vltavou
- The Madonna of Rouchovany (c. 1300), National Gallery in Prague
- St Benigna (before 1327), National Gallery in Prague
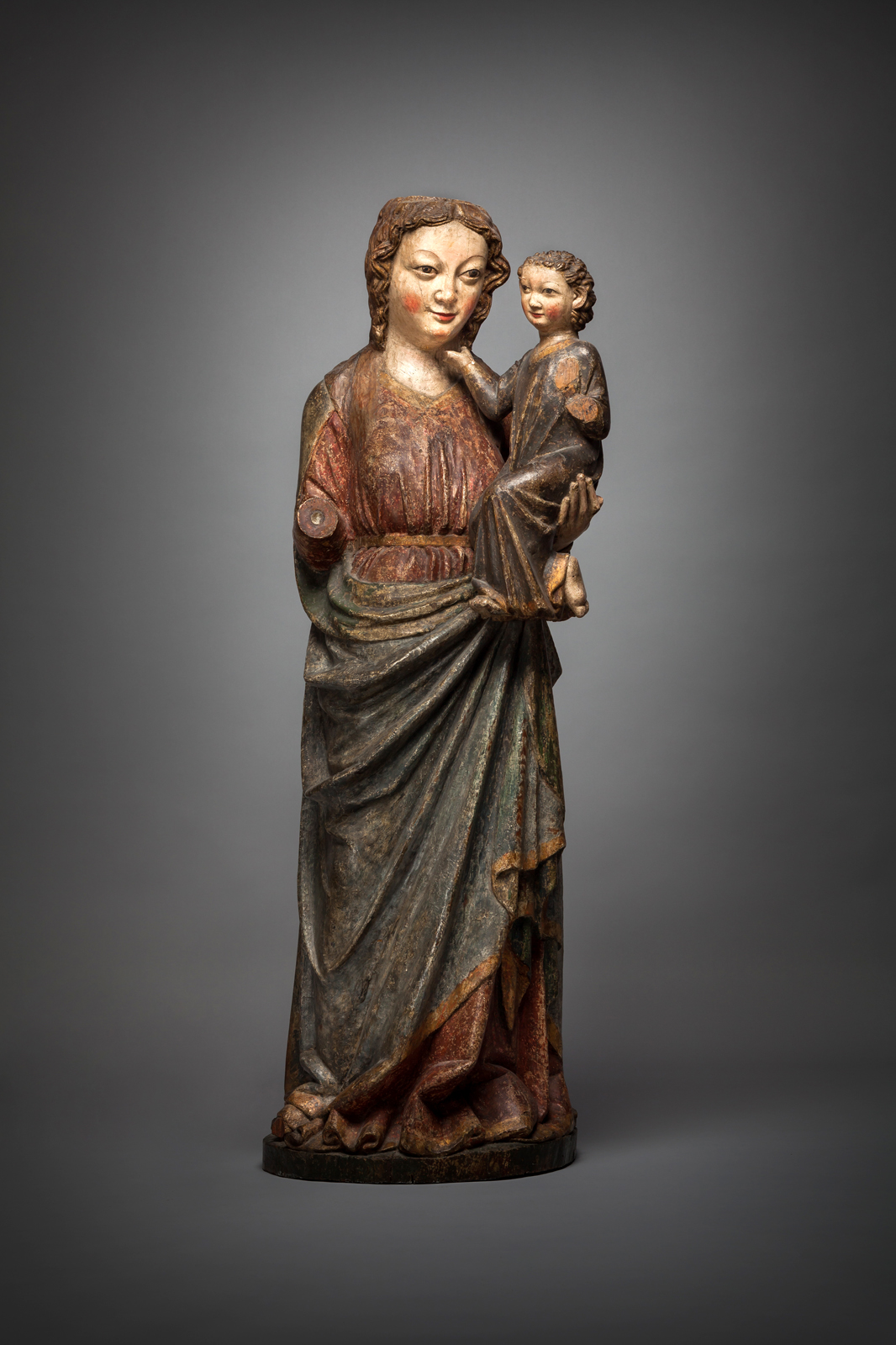
Madonna of Rudolfov (1274), Aleš South Bohemian Gallery in Hluboká nad Vltavou

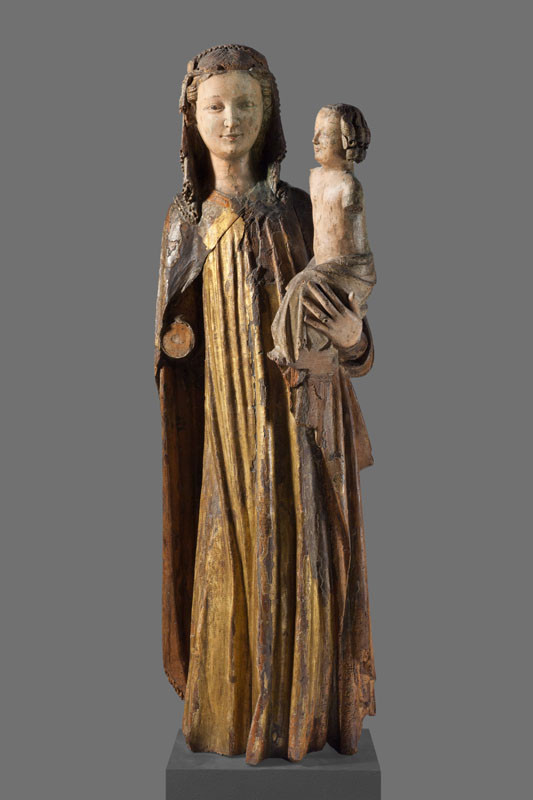
Madonna of Rouchovany (c. 1300), National Gallery in Prague

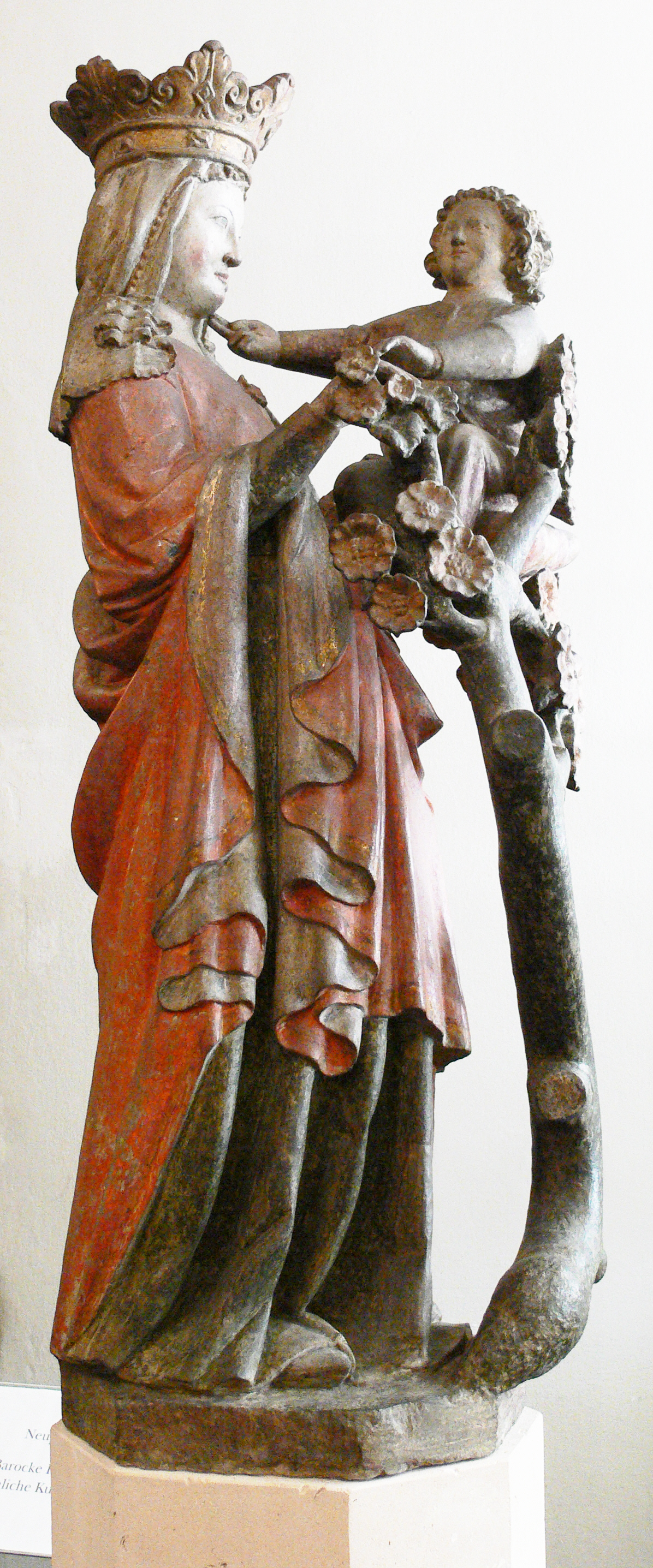
Muttergottes mit Jesuskind und Rosenstrauch (c. 1300), Bavarian National Museum, Munich

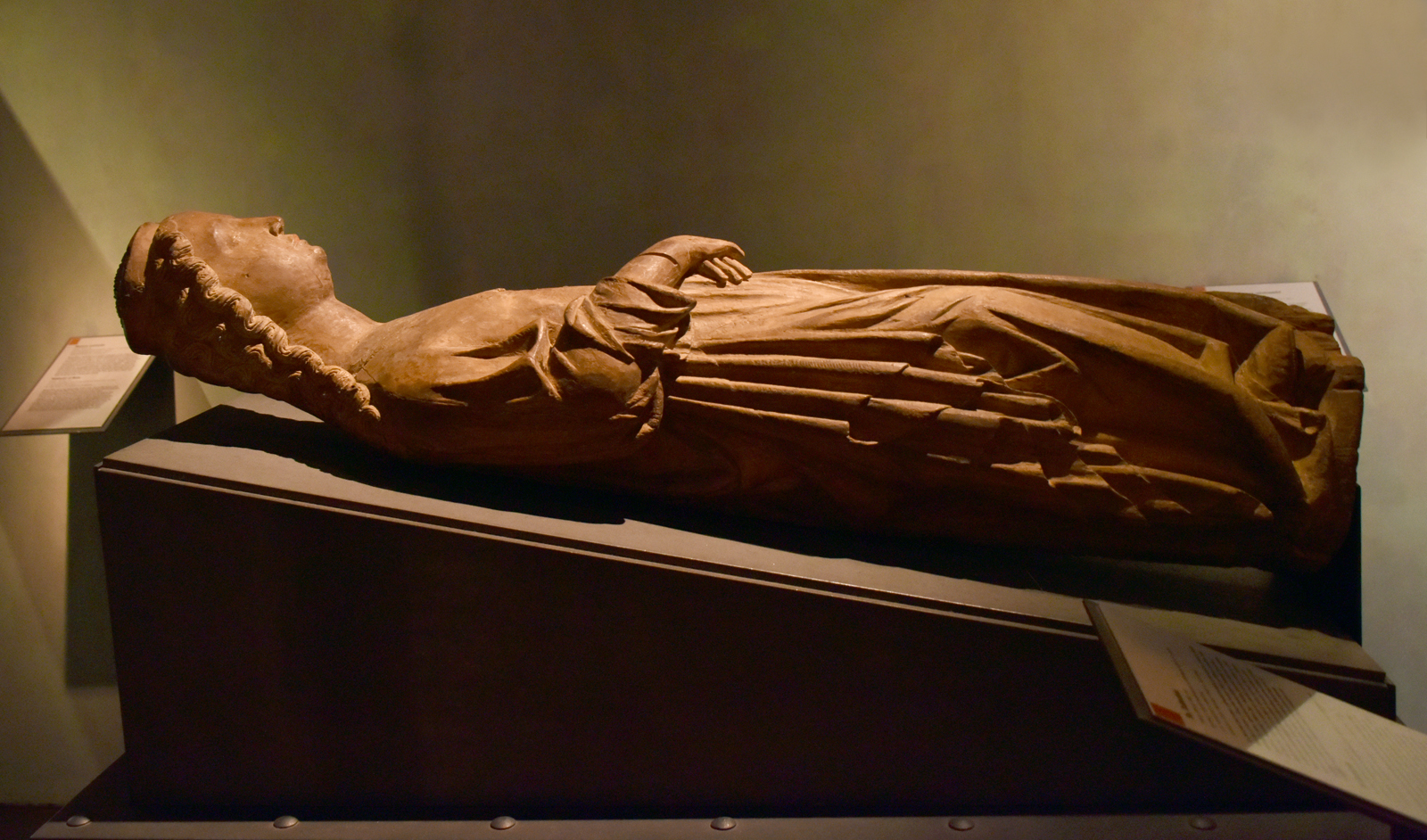
St Benigna (before 1327), National Gallery in Prague

== Sources ==
- Barbora Hoduláková, Vybrané sochy madon z období let 1150–1260 z českých sbírek, diplomová práce, KDU FF, Univerzita Palackého v Olomouci, 2016 on line
- Fajt J, Chlumská Š, Čechy a střední Evropa 1220–1550, Národní galerie v Praze 2014, ISBN 978-80-7035-569-5, s. 53–57
- Milan Knížák (ed.), 100 děl z Národní galerie v Praze, Národní galerie v Praze 2005, ISBN 80-7035-318-X
- Hynek Rulíšek, Gotické umění v jižních Čechách, Národní galerie v Praze 1989, ISBN 80-7035-013-X
- Albert Kutal, Gotické sochařství, in: Rudolf Chadraba (ed.), Dějiny českého výtvarného umění I/1, Academia Praha 1984
- Jiří Kuthan (ed.), Umění doby posledních Přemyslovců, Středočeské muzeum Roztoky, SSPPOP Středočeského kraje, 1982
