= Dominican Monastery (České Budějovice) =

Coordinates: 48°58′31.93″N 14°28′17.98″E

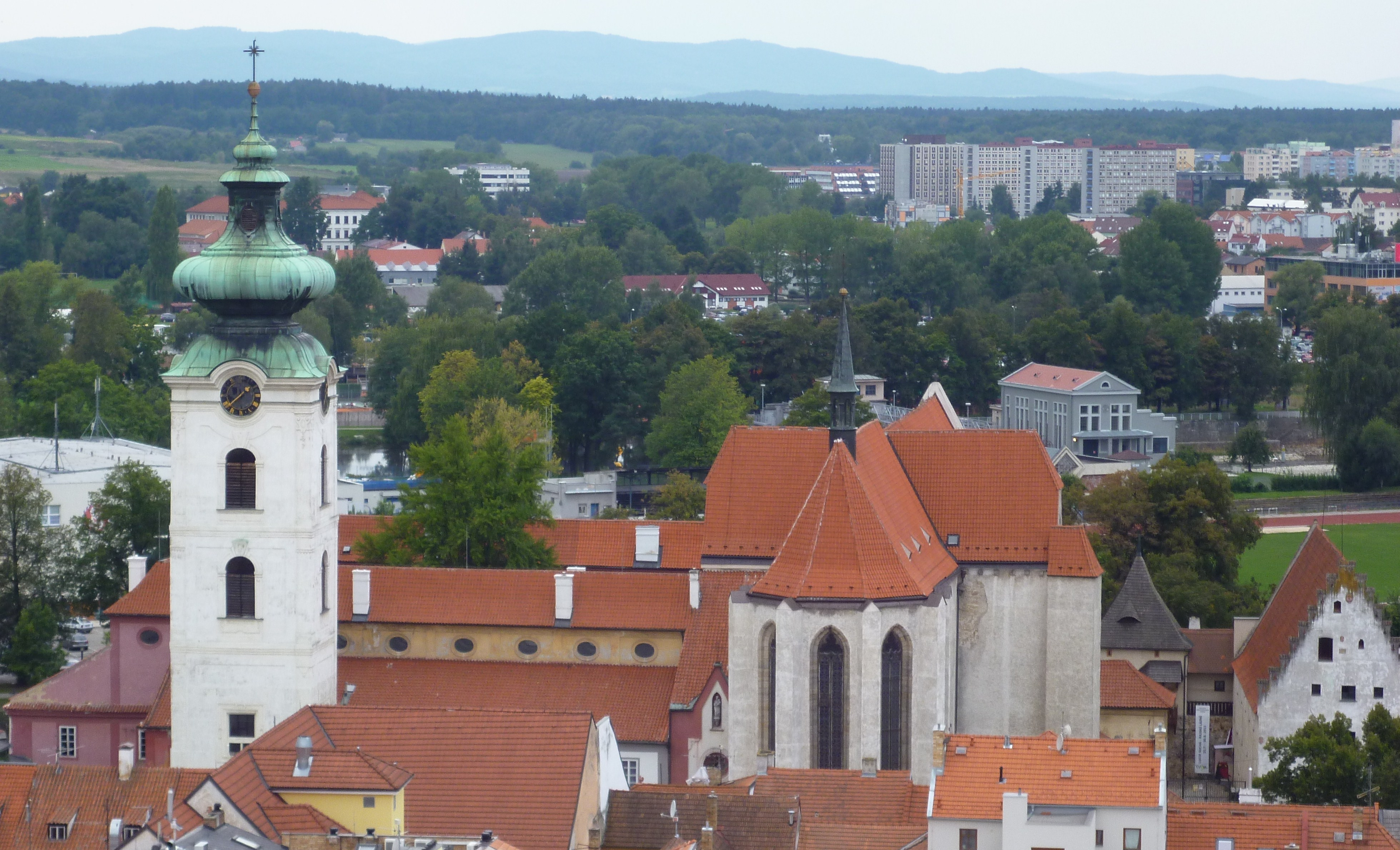
Dominican Monastery

Dominican Monastery (Czech: Dominikánský klášter) is the oldest gothic monument in České Budějovice. It consists of Church of Presentation of Virgin Mary and town fortifications. It is situated in south-western part of the historic centre between Street Česká, the bank of the river Malše and the Piaristic square were used to be the town cemetery. Today, the monastery belongs to the cultural heritage of the Czech Republic and there is placed the Artistic school.

== History ==
=== The Origin ===
The Dominican monastery in České Budějovice with the well-preserved Gothic cloister was built at the same time as the city. It was probably the first town building in the city of České Budějovice. The city was ranked among royal towns during the reign of king Ottokar II of Bohemia. The city was founded in 1265 by the Czech king Ottokar II of Bohemia. The monastery was founded probably a few years before by the same king.

The monastery was part of the town fortifications as was usual at that time. The monastery belonged to the order of Dominicans since its beginning. The cloister of monastery and the Church of Presentation of Virgin Mary are the only remains of the early gothic complex. Plans of the monastery were changed even during the construction in the 13th century. The whole monastery complex was probably completed at the beginning of the 14th century.

=== Baroque and Neo-Gothic reconstructions ===
Numerous fires are the reason of a lot of reconstructions. The most devastating fire destroyed convent buildings in 1723. The monastery was abolished by Emperor Joseph II in 1785. Piarists took it over and they set up the dormitory. They were replaced by Redemptonstis in 1885 who rebuilt the monastery in Neo-Gothic style and they left in 1949 because of the communist regime.

=== Nowadays ===
The church belongs to the diocese of České Budějovice. During communism regime there was the Artistic School, Revenue Authority, Academy of Komenský and school canteen. Since 1990, there is the Artistic School for children.

== Exterior ==
The exterior of monastery, unlike the church, is marked by numerous, mainly Baroque, reconstructions. Reconstructions are visible on the facade chiefly on the roof extension with noticeable baroque elliptic windows. Original gothic tower with the bulb dome was completely rebuilt in Baroque style except one Gothic window which remained on the first floor. All exterior portals are also Baroque apart from the Gothic one in the south-western part of the monastery's wall. The arches of the cloister and the first floor towards the heavenly court are maintained in the Gothic style. The tracery of windows isn't original; windows in two arches of cloister and neogothic extension in court have neogothic division. The first lanced arch consists of small saddle portal; tapered tracery with three and four-leaves, is decorated by another tracery in flamboyant style. The second tracery is divided by more dense net of spherical triangles and three and four-leaves. Narrow windows on the five-side extension in the court are divided into two parts and triangle with three-leaves.

== Interior ==
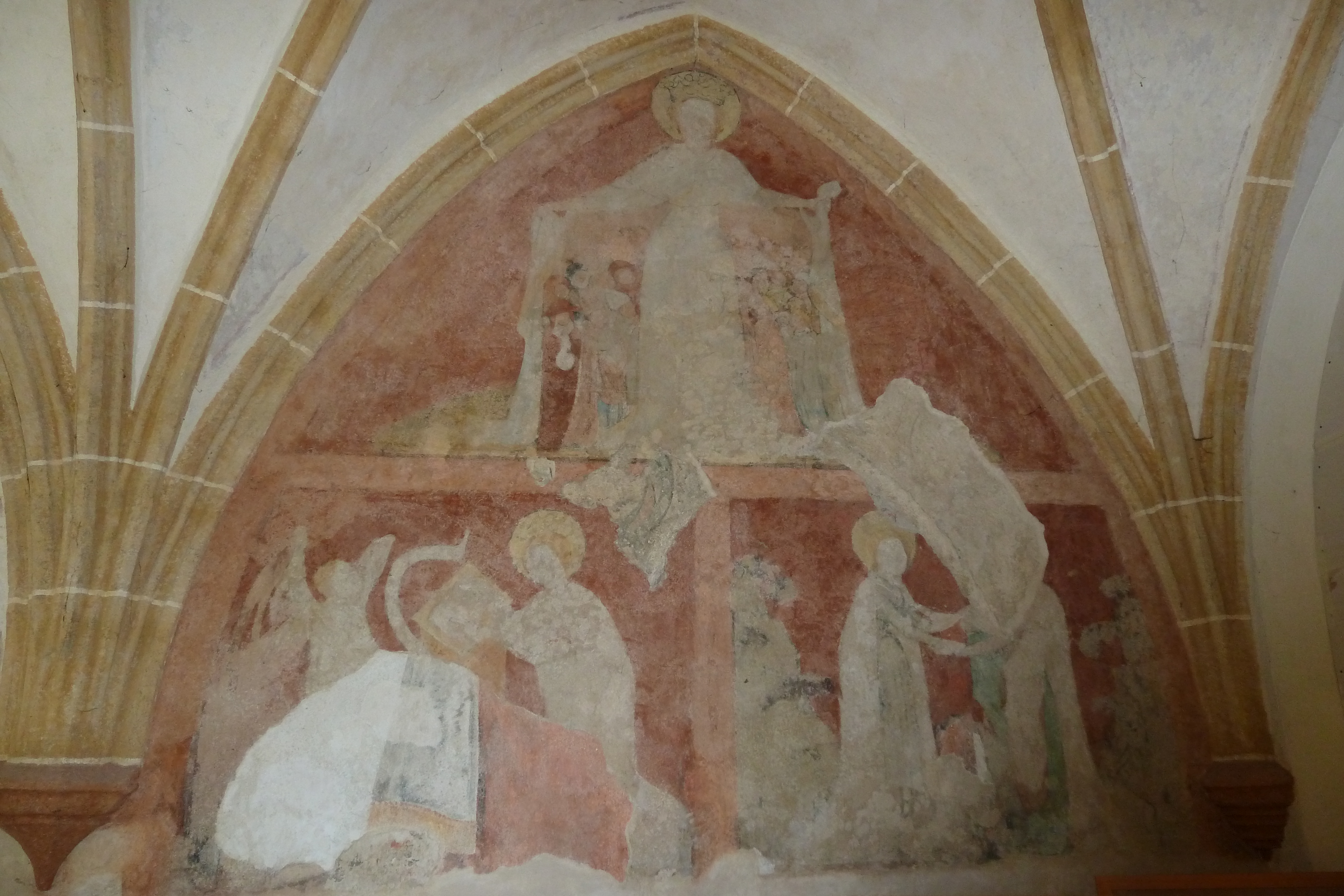
Wall picture of the Holy Virgin, patron of České Budějovice

The most significant interior architectural monument is the inner wall of cloister. On the wall of cloister there are visible wall-paintings, remains of former portals, niches and windows with preserved metal division which are wall up nowadays. Some parts which are surrounded by the arch and the bracket contain both the right window and the portal beside it. The rest of the field was decorated by wall-paintings.

Vault is cross like in the church and ribs have similar profile as the ribs in the church. Brackets in inner side of cloister are simply formed without decoration; we can also find atypical supports with vegetable motives. In the court direction the arc is supported by two columns with heads decorated by vegetable motives. In other corners pillars with undecorated heads step 10 cm in space. Each bay of the vault between ribs was decorated as well as walls. The most valuable wall-picture is located in the cloister and shows Holy Virgin, the patron of České Budějovice, who hides real figures of the emperor Charles IV, Holy Roman Emperor and his son Wenceslaus IV of Bohemia under the open coat. Painting dates back probably to 1378. Between 5 and 7 May 1378 the emperor Charles IV with his 17-year-old son spent their time in the royal town České Budějovice where they were attending meeting with Czech aristocrats, ecclesiastics and the nobleman of the Holy Roman Empire. It is also necessary to mention well-preserved gothic extension above well called "Well Chapel" in southern part of cloister.

== Curiosity ==
Many legends are associated with the foundation of the monastery by king Ottokar II of Bohemia. They explain for example the name of the city. According to one legend, king Ottokar II of Bohemia promised to found the monastery on place where he got the news about the birth of his first child, a boy. It happened at the confluence of the rivers Vltava and Malše. It was said that king exclaimed "It will be more than one" thinking about other children. It is the explanation of the name Budějovice ("bude" in Czech=it will be in English, "více" in Czech= more than one in English) Another legend says that Ottokar's words were said in connection with increasing Dominican's settlement. However České Budějovice were founded on the green grassland, it is documented that small villages were there before the foundation. Some theories claim that České Budějovice inherited the name from the Czech noblemen Budivoj who was the member of noble family Vítkovci. No version denies that the monastery was founded earlier than the town. Writer Jan Styral coming from České Budějovice also claimed it in the 16th century. He agreed with the version about the birth of descendant, which was disproved by Bohuslav Balbín who said that the monastery was founded as result of king Ottokar II of Bohemia´s wish having his child with his first wife Margaret of Austria, Queen of Bohemia.

== Gallery ==
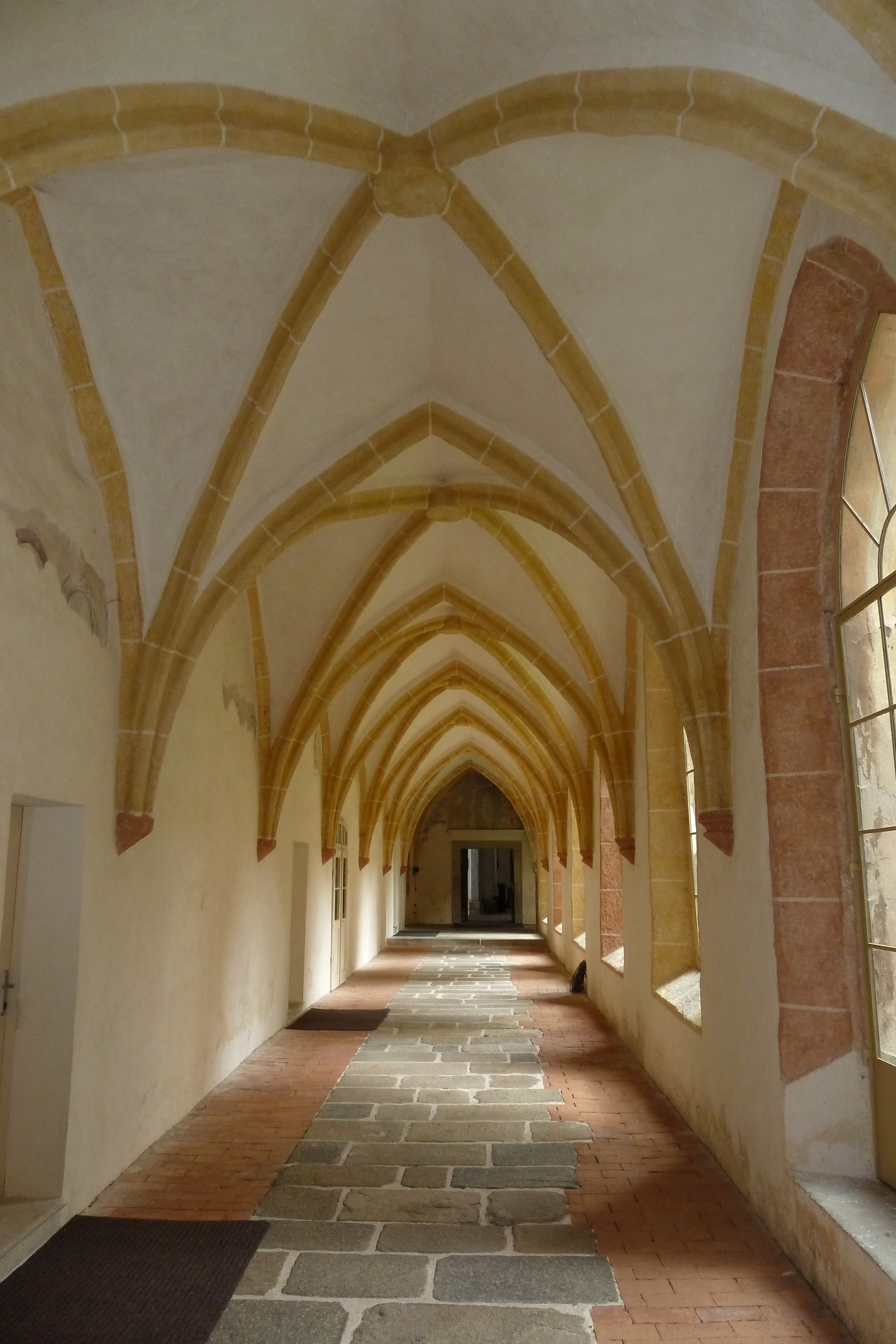
Ambit of the Monastery

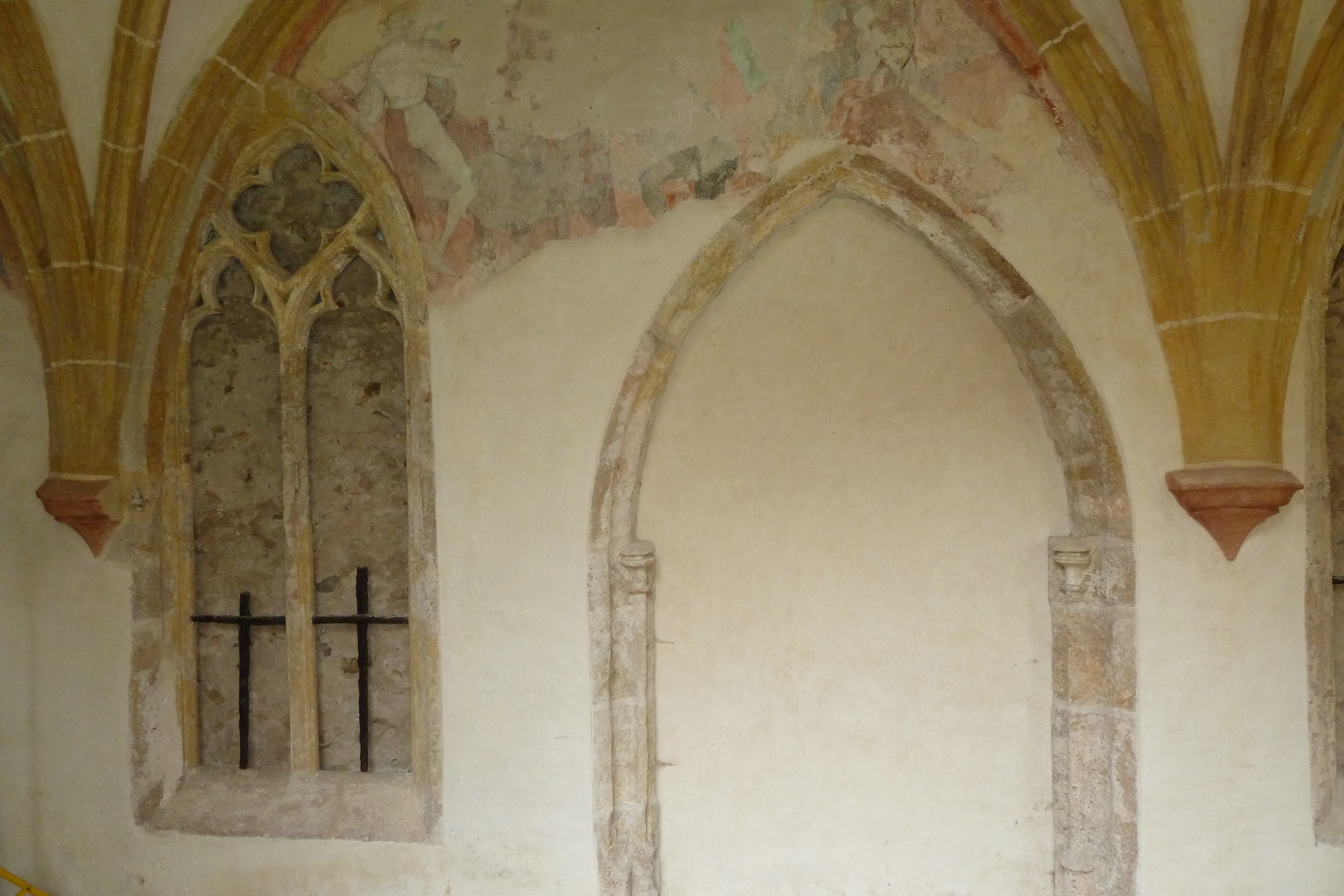
Former portal and window

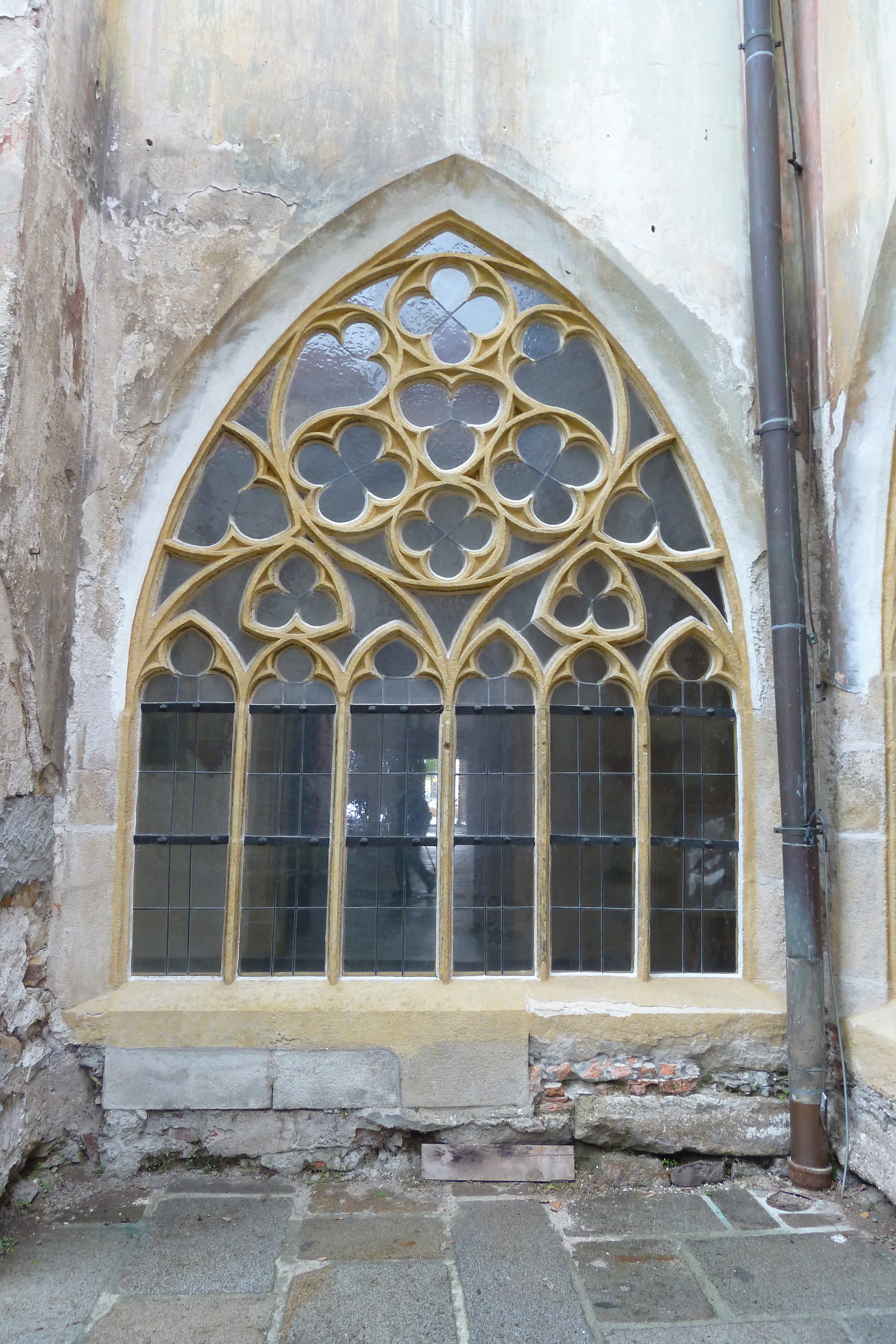
Rosettes in the window of the ambit

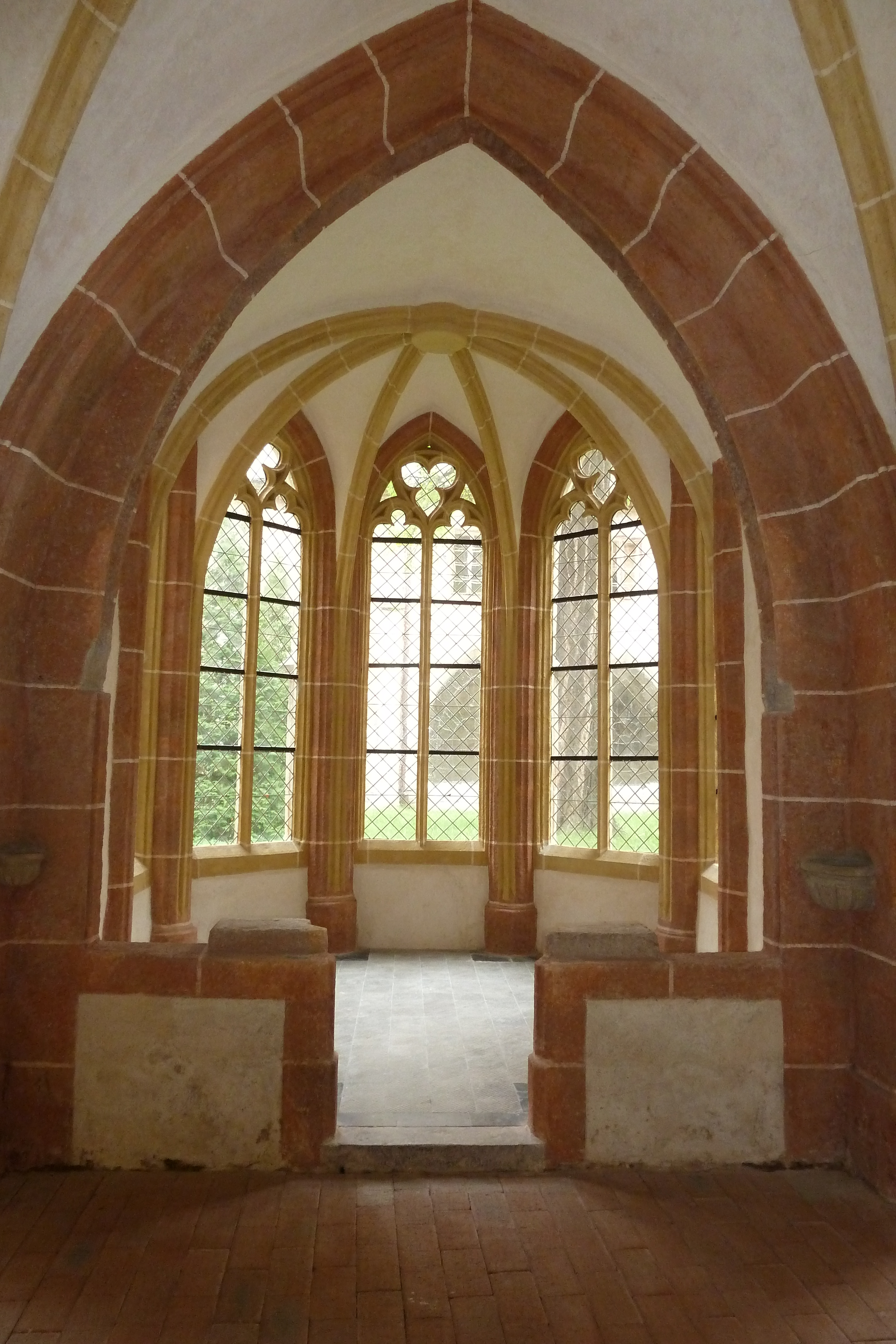
Well chapel

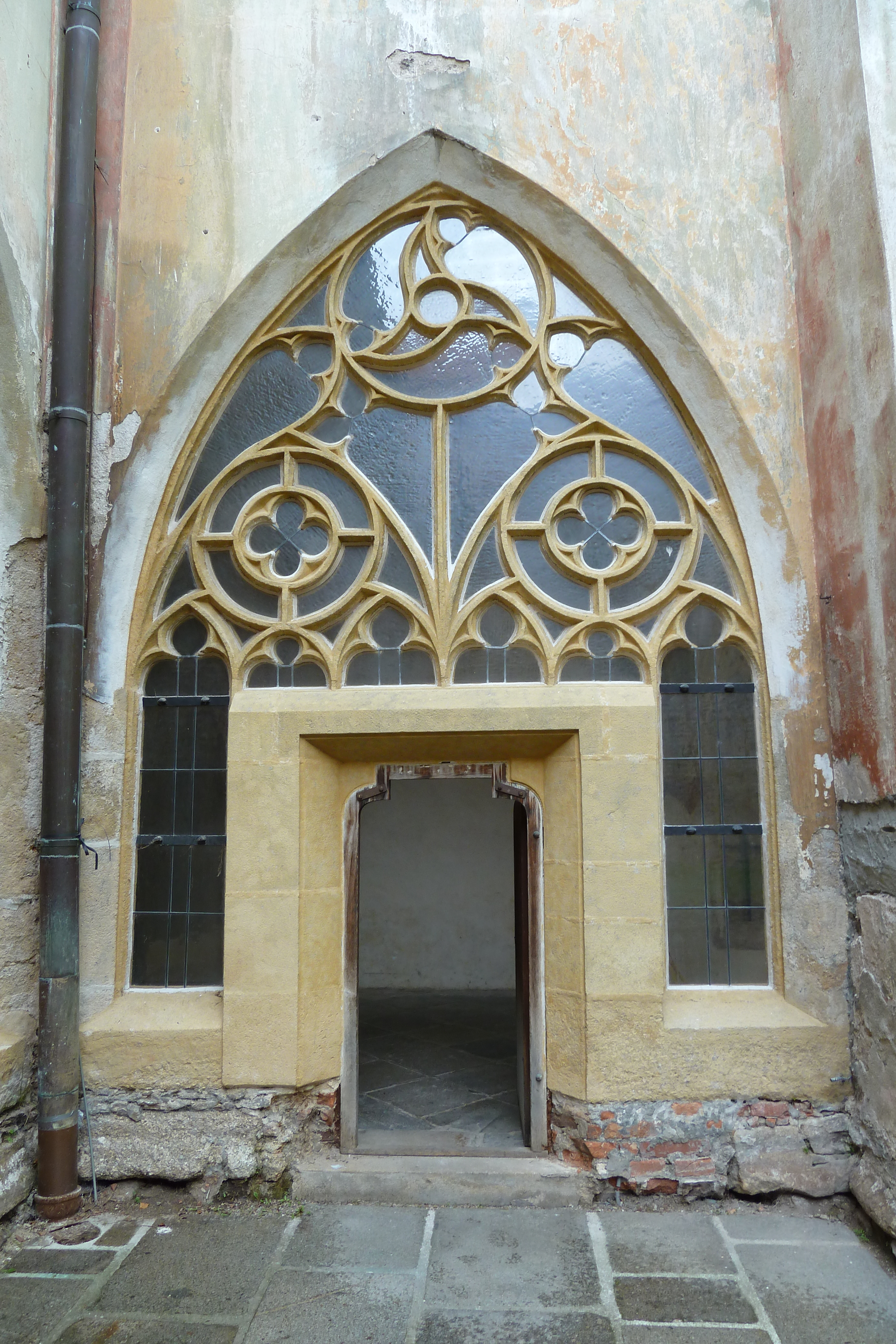
Rosettes in the window of the ambit

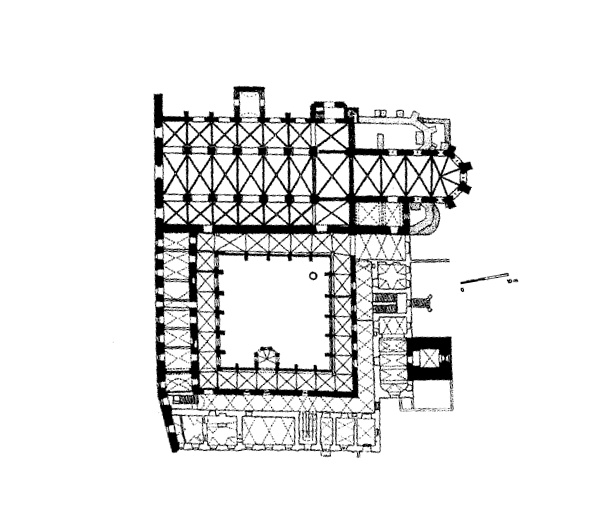
Plan

== Sources ==
- BRANIŠ, Josef. Soupis památek historických a uměleckých v Království českém. VIII.Politický okres česko-budějovický. Praha, 1900
- HOSPODKOVÁ, Martina (2009). "Středověké nástěnné malby v klášterním kostele Obětování Panny Marie v Českých Budějovicích [online]". Diplomová práce. Masarykova univerzita, Filozofická fakulta. Vedoucí práce Milena Bartlová.
- KUTHAN, Jiří. Gotická architektura v jižních Čechách - Zakladatelské dílo Přemysla Otakara II. Praha : Academia, 1975.
- LÍBAL, Dobroslav. Katalog gotické architektury do husitských válek. Praha: Unicornis, 2001.
- MIKOVEC, Ferdinand Břetislav. Starožitnosti a Památky země České.. Ilustrace Josef Vojtěch Hellich, Vilém Kandler. Praha : Kober a Markgraf, [1860]. Available online. -kapitola Křížová chodba v klášteře dominikánů v Budějovicích českých., s. 38–41.
- PAVELEC, Petr. Nové poznatky o klášterním kostele Obětování Panny Marie v Českých Budějovicích. Zprávy památkové péče, 1996, 57(9-10), s. 296–305. ISSN 1210-5538.
- SOUKUPOVÁ, Helena. Rekonstrukce dominikánského kostela Panny Marie v Českých Budějovicích.In: Umění 13. století v českých zemích: příspěvky z vědeckého zasedání (2.-14. prosince 1981, Praha) = Kunst des 13. Jahrhunderts in den böhmischen Ländern: Beiträge der wissenschaftlichen Tagung (2.-4. Dezember 1981, Prag). Praha: Československá akademie věd, Ústav teorie a dějin umění, 1983.

== See also ==
- České Budějovice
- Presentation of Virgin Mary Church
