= Black Tower (Brașov) =

Coordinates: 45.6413°N 25.5856°E

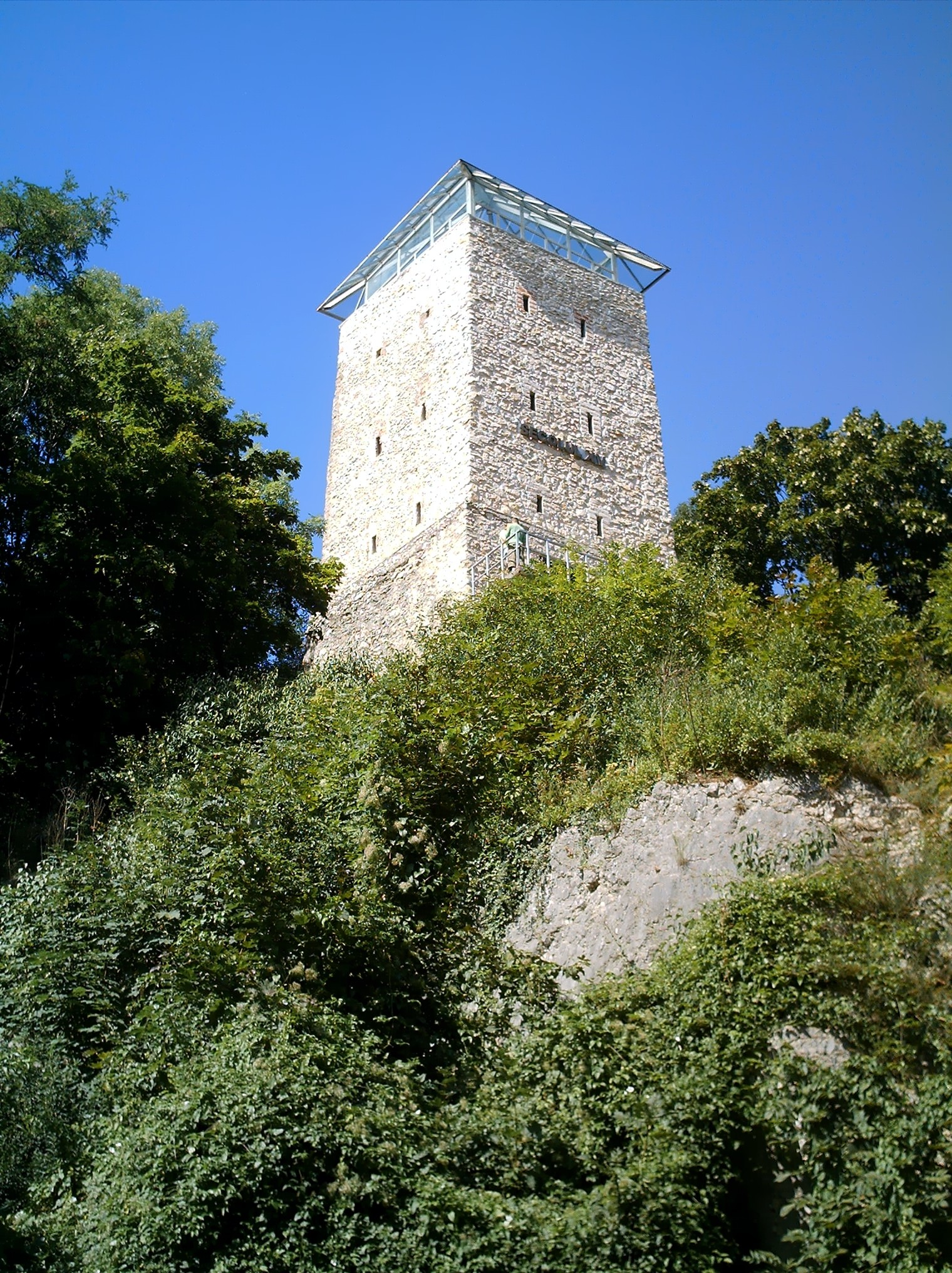
A view of the present-day tower, covered in glass

Black Tower (Romanian: Turnul Negru; German: Schwarze Turm;Hungarian: Fekete torony) is a fort of Braşov, Romania

The tower located on a large rock on Warthe Hill. The purpose of the tower was to deny enemy soldiers access to the city walls, which, in this case, were no further than 5 meters (the pass was only widened in 1819–1820).
